A list of poems by Robert E. Howard (1906–1936), an American writer and poet in early 20th-century Texas. His love of poetry came from being read to by his mother at a young age. However, his attempts to make a living by poetry were unsuccessful and he is today most remembered for his short stories and fiction. Nevertheless, Howard wrote hundreds of poems; many were published within his lifetime and the others published after his 1936 suicide.

Key

The lack of information in a column does not necessarily mean that the information does not exist, only that verifiable information is not currently available. For example, the lack of publication information does not necessarily mean that a poem has not been published to date, nor does the lack of a definite note about the public domain indicate that a poem is still under copyright.

This table may be sorted by different columns by clicking on the icon in the appropriate column.  Clicking the icon again will alternate between ascending and descending order.

Additional notes

Title/Alternative title: Some poems are known by multiple titles.  Alternative titles are shown in the column of the same name. Every effort has been made to list full information at all entries for each title, to save the user time in scrolling. Occasionally, alternative titles appear consecutively, in which case the second entry will follow without additional information, shown in a darker gray on the table.  In other cases, some poems were not titled by Howard or the original title has not survived. Some poems have been given tentative titles after Howard's death; this is indicated in the Notes column. Where multiple titles exist, they have been listed alphabetically by their various designations following the word "Untitled."  Some pieces of poetry were used by Howard as epigraphs within his stories.  listed these poems under the title of the short story rather than the title of the poem itself, so the poems are listed under those titles as well.  With epigraphs, the first publication information given in this table is that of the poem's first printing separated from the story.

Lines: The number of lines in the poem.

Source text: Links given in the Source Text column are to copies of the poem in online libraries (where available). For ease of browsing the table, these links are preceded by a small icon. For example,  for poems on Wikisource.

References: Bibliographic references are given in the final column of each row.  The exception to this is the Notes column; as notes may come from diverse sources, or from a separate part of one of the main sources, each individual note is followed by its own reference.

Poetry
{| class="wikitable sortable"
|-
! width="15%" | Title
! width="3%"  | Lines
! width="15%" | Opening line
! width="13%" | Place of publication
! width="7%"  | Publication date
! width="8%"  | Alternative title(s)
! width="8%"  | Source text
! width="21%" | Notes
! width="10%" | References
|-
| Palace of Bast, The || 23 || She sits all day on an ebon couch || Chacal #2 || 1977-03-21 Spring 1977 || Palace of Bast ||  ||  || 
|-
| Palm-trees are waving in the Gulf breeze || putatively 36 lines, when divided into couplets, but some lines and stanzas are written across the page like prose || Palm-trees are waving in the Gulf breeze || Austin, vol. 3, no. 1 || 1992-05 May 1992 || Untitled: Palm-trees are waving in the Gulf breeze ||  || Letter: Tevis Clyde Smith, September 7, 1924 ; Distributed as part of REHUPA #115  || 
|-
| Parody || 20 || What is so vile as a February day? || Always Comes Evening(Underwood-Miller edition) || 1977 || February ||  || The oldest known Howard poem, written January 28, 1921 at Cross Plains Highschool; Tentative title ; A parody of the famous passage that begins "And what is so rare as a day in June?" from James Russell Lowell's THE VISION OF SIR LAUNFAL ; An early work  || 
|-
| The Parrot || 20 || When the king and his folk lay dead || A Means to Freedom: The Letters of H. P. Lovecraft and Robert E. Howard ||  ca. July 1934 ||  ||  || Mnemonic reconstruction of the Alfred Noyes poem of the same name;Letter: H. P. Lovecraft; NOT INCLUDED IN COLLECTED POETRY ||  p. 769-770
|-
| Passing of the Elder Gods || 4 || The elder gods have fled || A Rhyme of Salem Town and Other Poems || 2002 || Untitled ("The elder gods have fled") ||  || Tentative title  || 
|-
| Passionate Typist, The || 12 || My love, to you this verse I pen || The Howard Review #5 || 1976-11 Nov 1976 ||  ||  ||  || 
|-
| Path of the Strange Wanderers, The || 27 || They have broken the lamps and burst the camps  || Shadows of Dreams || 1989 ||  ||  || Letter: Tevis Clyde Smith, c. March 1929  || 
|-
| Peasant on the Euphrates, The || 10 || He saw Old Sumer reel before the hoofs || A Rhyme of Salem Town and Other Poems || 2002 ||  ||  ||  || 
|-
| Perspective || 4 || All men look at Life and all look differently || A Rhyme of Salem Town and Other Poems || 2002 || Untitled ("All men look at life ...") ||  || Tentative title  || 
|-
|  Peter Jackson  ||  ||  || n/a || n/a ||  ||  || Lost || Thom, Herman & Woods, § C
|-
| Phantoms Gather, The || 6 || Up over the cromlech and down the rath || A Rhyme of Salem Town and Other Poems || 2002 || Untitled ("Up over the cromlech ...") ||  || Tentative title  || 
|-
| Phases of Life, The || 5 || Life is the same, yet of many phases || Unaussprechlichen Kulten #2 || 1992-07 Jul 1992 || Untitled ("Life is the same ...") ||  || Tentative title ; French  || 
|-
| Phoenix on the Sword, The || Two 4-line verses for a total of 8 || 3.  Under the caverned pyramids great Set coils asleep / 4.  When the world was young and men were weak, and the fiends of the night walked free || Always Comes Evening || 1957 || Chapters 2 and 5 are subtitled "The Road of Kings"—-see complete poem under that title) ||  || Epigraph: The Phoenix on the Sword ; The fifth verse was published alone earlier in Crit-Q (1951)' Chapter 1 had no heading;  || 
|-
| Pirate, The  || 8 || I was born in Devonshire, close by Bristol Bay || A Rhyme of Salem Town and Other Poems || 2002 ||  ||  || An early work  || 
|-
| Pirate Remembers, A || 22 || From the scarlet shadows they come to me || The Grim Land and Others || 1976 ||  ||  ||  || 
|-
| Plains of Gilban, The || 12 || Red swirls the dust || A Rhyme of Salem Town and Other Poems || 2002 || Untitled ("Red swirls the dust") ||  || Tentative title  || 
|-
| Pledge, A || 28 || Oe ever they spiked good beer with rum || The Howard Collector #14 || 1971-03-21 Spring 1971 ||  ||  ||  || 
|-
| Poet || 4 || My soul is a blaze || The Cross Plainsman || 2004-08 Aug 2004 ||  ||  Wikisource || Letter: Tevis Clyde Smith, June 23, 1926 ; PD || 
|-
| Poets, The || 28 || Out of the somber night the poets come || Weird Tales || 1938-03 Mar 1938 ||  ||  "The Poets" ||  || 
|-
| Poet's Skull, A || 56 || My empty skull is full of dust || Shadows of Dreams || 1989 || Untitled: ("My empty skull is full of dust") ||  || Letter: Tevis Clyde Smith, undated  || 
|-
| Pool of the Black One, The || 6 || Into the west, unknown of man || Lost Continents || 1954 ||  ||  || Epigraph: The Pool of the Black One  || 
|-
| Prelude || 4 || I caught Joan alone upon her bed || A Rhyme of Salem Town and Other Poems || 2002 || Untitled ("I caught Joan alone upon her bed") ||  || Tentative title  || 
|-
|  Pretty Polly || 56 || "Now take a part of your father's gold ..." || The Collected Letters of Robert E. Howard, Volume 1: 1923-1929 || 2007-06 Jun 2007 || || https://www.youtube.com/watch?v=bq6RldgW7NQ || Mnemonic reconstruction of "Lady Isabel and the Elf Knight"  "The Outlandish Knight"; Letter: Robert W. Gordon, April 9, 1926; NOT INCLUDED IN COLLECTED POETRY ||
|-
| Primal Urge, The || 7 || The wild geese fly south, carving the cold blue sky || Desire and Other Erotic Poems || 1989 ||  ||  || Tentative title  || 
|-
| Prince and Beggar || 18 || I was a prince of China, lord of a million spears || Always Comes Evening || 1957 || Untitled ("I was a prince of China, lord of a million spears ...") ||  || Originally untitled  || 
|-
| Private Magrath of the A.E.F. || 39 || The night was as dark as a Bowery saloon || The Yellow Jacket || 1927-01-13 13 January 1927 ||  ||  Wikisource || One line was omitted in all printed versions ; First line originally ended "Harlem coon"; PD || 
|-
| Proem || 148 || Let no man read here who lives only in the world about him. ... || Etchings In Ivory (Chapbook) || 1968 ||  Untitled introduction to ETCHINGS IN IVORY ||  ||  ||
|-
| Prude || 4 || I dare not join my sisters in the street  || The Last of the Trunk Och Brev I Urval || 2007-03 Mar 2007 ||  ||  Wikisource || Letter: Tevis Clyde Smith, June 23, 1926 ; PD || 
|-
| Quatrain of Beauty, A || 4 || Silky winds are sighing low || A Rhyme of Salem Town and Other Poems || 2002 || A Quattrain of Beauty ||  ||  || 
|- 
| Queen of the Black Coast || 23 || "Believe green buds awaken in the spring ..."; "In that dead citadel of crumbling stone ..."; "Was it a dream the nighted lotus brought? ..."; "The shadows were black around him ..."; "Now we are done with roaming, evermore ...") || Always Comes Evening || 1957 || Song of Bêlit, The ||  || Epigraph: Queen of the Black Coast  || 
|-
|  Rain No Mo' (Early Version) || 2 4-line verses, plus a 4-line chorus repeated after each verse || Steal, steal, steal all around || The Collected Letters of Robert E. Howard, Volume 1: 1923-1929 || 2007-06 Jun 2007 || ||  || Mnemonic reconstruction of an old folk song, possibly this one: https://www.youtube.com/watch?v=Izug5iG-Ewo Letter: Robert W. Gordon, February 4, 1925; NOT INCLUDED IN COLLECTED POETRY ||
|-
|  Ramona! Romona! || 4 || Romona! Romona! || The Last of the Trunk Och Brev I Urval || 2007-03 Mar 2007 || Untitled: Romona! Romona! ||  Wikisource  || Letter: Tevis Clyde Smith, c. November–December 1928 ; PD; "Ramona" spelling probably a typo || 
|-
| Rattle of Drums || 48 || Rattle of drums || A Rhyme of Salem Town and Other Poems || 2002 || Untitled ("Rattle of drums") ||  || Tentative title  || 
|-
| Rattlesnake Sings in the Grass, A || 20 || Oh, brother coiling in the acrid grass || n/a || n/a ||  ||  Wikisource || Shares lines with Hymn of Hatred ; Never published ; PD || 
|-
| Rebel || 108 || I lived upon the earth of yore || Singers in the Shadows || 1970 || The Rebel ||  ||  || 
|-
|  Rebel souls from the falling dark  || 8 || Rebel souls from the falling dark || The Collected Letters of Robert E. Howard, Volume 1: 1923-1929 || 2007-06 Jun 2007 || Untitled: Rebel souls from the falling dark ||  Wikisource || Letter: Tevis Clyde Smith, c. November 1928 ; PD || 
|-
| Rebellion || 14 || The marble statues tossed against the sky  || Poet's Scroll || 1929-02 Feb 1929 ||  ||  Wikisource || Pen name: Patrick Howard ; Letter: Tevis Clyde Smith, c. November 1928 ; PD || 
|-
| Recompense || 24 || I have not heard lutes beckon me, nor the brazen budles call || Weird Tales || 1938-11 Nov 1938 ||  ||  "Recompense" Wikisource ||  || 
|-
| Red Blades of Black Cathay || 12 || Trumpets die in the loud parade || Always Comes Evening || 1957 ||  ||  || Epigraph: Red Blades of Black Cathay  || 
|-
| "Red swirls the dust" || 12 || Red swirls the dust || A Rhyme of Salem Town and Other Poems || 2002 || Plains of Gilban, The; Untitled ("Red swirls the dust") ||  || Tentative title  || 
|-
| Red Thunder || 24 || Thunder in the black skies, beating down the rain || JAPM: The Poetry Weekly || 1929-09-16 16 September 1929 ||  ||  Wikisource || PD || 
|-
| Remembrance || 14 || Eight thousand years ago a man I slew || Weird Tales || 1928-04 Apr 1928 ||  ||  "Remembrance" ||  || 
|-
|  Reminiscence  ||  ||  || n/a || n/a ||  ||  || Lost || Thom, Herman & Woods, § C
|-
| Renunciation || 59 || By the crimson cliffs where the spray is blown || The Last of the Trunk Och Brev I Urval || 2007-03 Mar 2007 ||  ||  Wikisource || Letter:to Tevis Clyde Smith, undated ; PD || 
|-
| Repentance || 36 || How is it that I am what I am || The Last of the Trunk Och Brev I Urval || 2007-03 Mar 2007 ||  ||  Wikisource || Letter: Tevis Clyde Smith, c. March 1928 ; PD || 
|-
| Retribution || 22 || The moon above the Kerry hills had risen scarce a span || Always Comes Evening || 1957 || Black Michael's Story; The Song of Murtagh O'Brien; Untitled ("The moon above the Kerry hills ...") ||  "Retribution" || Titled Retribution from an untitled draft, Howard's original title The Song of Murtagh O'Brien was found on a later copy  || 
|-
| Return of Sir Richard Grenville, The || 44 || One slept beneath the branches dim || Red Shadows || 1968 || Untitled ("One slept beneath the branches dim") ||  || Originally untitled ; A Solomon Kane poem || 
|-
| Return of the Sea-Farer, The || 36 || Thorfinn, Thorfinn, where have you been? || Weirdbook #13 || 1978 || Untitled: ("Thorfinn, Thorfinn, where have you been?") ||  ||  || 
|-
| Reuben's Birthright || 42 || The Black Prince scowled above his lance, and wrath in his hot eyes lay || The JuntoThe Howard Collector #2 || 1929-08 Aug 1929Spring 1962 || The Skull in the Clouds ||  Wikisource || Conflict: , The Howard Collector, 1962/, The Junto, 1929; PD || { 
|-
| Reuben's Brethren || 16 || Drain the cup while the ale is bright || The Howard Collector #11 || 1969-03-21 Spring 1969 ||  ||  || Letter: H. P. Lovecraft, c. October 1930  || 
|-
| Revolt Pagan || 16 || High on the hills where the white winds thunder || Verses of Ebony || 1975 ||  ||  ||  || 
|-
| A Rhyme of Faring Town || 28 || Her house, a moulting buzzard on the Hill || Verses in Ebony || 1975 || Legend of Faring Town, A ||  ||  || 
|-
| Rhyme of Salem Town, A || 74 || As I went down to Salem town, I met good Mistress Meek || A Rhyme of Salem Town and Other Poems || 2002 || Untitled ("As I went down to Salem town ...") ||  || Tentative title  || 
|-
| Rhyme of the Three Slavers, The || 48 || Still and dim lay sea and land || The Rhyme of the Three Slavers || 1983-10 Oct 1983 ||  ||  ||  || 
|-
| Rhyme of the Viking Path, The || 24 || Serpent prow on the Afric coast || The Howard Collector #11 || 1969-03-21 Spring 1969 || Thor's Son ||  || Letter: Tevis Clyde Smith; c. May 1930)  || 
|-
| Ride of Falume, The || 24 || Falume of Spain rode forth amain when twilight's crimson fell || Weird Tales || 1927-10 Oct 1927 ||  ||  Wikisource || PD || 
|-
| Riders of Babylon, The || 22 || The riders of Babylon clatter forth || Weird Tales || 1928-01 Jan 1928 ||  ||  Wikisource || PD || 
|-
| Riding Song || 20 || Do you know the terrible thrill that comes || The Howard Review #2 || 1975-03 Mar 1975 ||  ||  || Not to be confused with "A Riding Song" || 
|-
| Riding Song, A || 20 || Blast away the black veil, / Blast away the blue || Shadows of Dreams || 1989 ||  ||  || Not to be confused with "Riding Song" || 
|-
| "Rise to the peak of the ladder" || 16 || Rise to the peak of the ladder || The Ghost Ocean and Other Poems of the Supernatural || 1982 || Never Beyond the Beast; Untitled ("Rise to the peak of the ladder") ||  || Tentative title  || 
|-
|  The Road  ||  ||  || n/a || n/a ||  ||  || Lost || Thom, Herman & Woods, § C
|-
| Road of Azrael, The || 22 || Towers reel as they burst asunder || Always Comes Evening || 1957 || The Song Of Skel Thorwald's Son ||  "The Road of Azrael" || Originally untitled ; Epigraph: The Road of Azrael  || 
|-
| Road of Kings, The || 12 || When I was a fighting man, the kettle drums they beat || Always Comes Evening || 1957 || The Phoenix on the Sword (verse heading); The Scarlet Citadel (verse heading) ||  || Epigraph: The Phoenix on the Sword and The Scarlet Citadel  || 
|-
| Road to Babel, The || 108 || Along the road to Babel ... || Shadows of Dreams || 1989 ||  ||  ||  Letter: Tevis Clyde Smith, October 1927 || 
|-
| Road to Bliss, The || 28 || I did not give a tinker's curse / For the Stuarts or the Church ... || A Rhyme of Salem Town and Other Poems || 2002  ||  ||  ||  || 
|-
| Road to Freedom, The || 10 || Some day I'm going out on the Road || Cross Plains #7 || 1975-09 Sep 1975 ||  ||  ||  || 
|-
| Road to Hell, The || 28 || Along the road that leads to Hell || Singers in the Shadows || 1970 || Untitled ("The road to hell ...") ||  Wikisource || Lines 1-4 similar to lines 69-72 of The Dust Dance (version 1) ; PD || 
|- 
| Road to Rest, The  || 44 || I will rise some day when the day is done || The JuntoThe Howard Collector #3 || 1929-08 Aug 1929Autumn 1962 || Surrender (1)  ||  Wikisource || PD; Conflict: , The Howard Collector, 1962/, The Junto, 1929 ||  
|-
| Road to Rome, The || 54 || Ah, feet that left a bloody track || The Road to Rome || 1972 ||  ||  ||  || 
|-
| Road to Yesterday, The || 16 || The dust is deep along the trail || The Grim Land and Others || 1976 ||  ||  || Suggested by the Cecil B. DeMille film The Road to Yesterday  || 
|-
| Roads || 4 || I too have strode those white-paved that run || The Howard Collector #17 || 1972-09-21 Autumn 1972 || Untitled ("I too have strode those white-paved roads") ||  || Originally untitled  || 
|-
| Roar, Silver Trumpets || 8 || Roar, silver trumpets, in your pride || Night Images || 1976 || Untitled ("Roar, silver trumpets") ||  || Tentative title  || 
|-
| Robes of the Righteous, The || 21 || I am a saintly reformer, basking in goodly renown || The Last of the Trunk Och Brev I Urval || 2007-03 Mar 2007 ||  ||  Wikisource || Letter: Tevis Clyde Smith, c. September 1927 ; PD || 
|-
| Rogues in the House (verse heading) || 3 || One fled ||  ||  || Old Rime || || This poem has only appeared with the story ||
|-
| Roman Lady, A || 40 || There is a strangeness in my soul || The Last of the Trunk Och Brev I Urval || 2007-03 Mar 2007 || Similar to "Ecstasy," a.k.a. UNTITLED: ("There is a strangeness in my soul ...") ||  Wikisource || Letter: Tevis Clyde Smith, c. June 1928 ; PD || 
|-
| Romance (1) || 23 || I am king of all the Ages || A Rhyme of Salem Town and Other Poems || 2002 ||  ||  Wikisource || || 
|-
| Romance (2) || Shouting I come, flouting I come || The Last of the Trunk Och Brev I Urval || 2007-03Mar 2007 ||  ||  || Letter: Tevis Clyde Smith, June 23, 1926  PD || 
|-
| Romany Road || 16 || Some day I'll go down a Romany Road  || Shadows of Dreams || 1989 ||  ||  || Letter: Tevis Clyde Smith, c. January 1928  || 
|-
|  Romona! Romona! || 4 || Romona! Romona! || The Last of the Trunk Och Brev I Urval || 2007-03 Mar 2007 || Untitled: Ramona! Romona! ||  Wikisource  || Letter: Tevis Clyde Smith, c. November–December 1928 ; PD || 
|-
|  Roses laughed in her pretty hair  || 10 || Roses laughed in her pretty hair || The Collected Letters of Robert E. Howard, Volume 1: 1923-1929 || 2007-06 Jun 2007 || Untitled: Roses laughed in her pretty hair ||  Wikisource  || Letter: Tevis Clyde Smith, August 28, 1925 ; PD || 
|-
| Roundelay of the Roughneck || 60 || Let others croon of lovers' moon || The Daniel Baker Collegian || 1926-04-12 12 April 1926 ||  ||  Wikisource || PD || 
|-
| Rover, The || 35 || In the heather hills of Scotland || A Rhyme of Salem Town and Other Poems || 2002 ||  ||  || Tentative title ; An early work  || 
|-
| Rulers, The || 64 || In everlasting legions || A Rhyme of Salem Town and Other Poems || 2002 ||  ||  ||  || 
|-
| Rules of Etiquette || 25 || If a girl stops you to talk while you are chasing your trains  || The Progress || 1924-02-01 1 February 1924 ||  ||  Wikisource || PD || 
|-
| Rune || 34 || Gods of heather, god of lake || Always Comes Evening || 1957 || Rune of the Ancient One; Untitled ("Gods of heather, gods of lake") ||  "Rune" || From: Men of the Shadows ; Originally untitled ; Separate version called Rune of the Ancient One  || 
|- style="background:#E0E0E0;"
| Rune of the Ancient One ||  ||  ||  ||  ||  ||  ||  || 
|-
| Russian Bill ||  ||  || n/a || n/a ||  ||  || Lost || Thom, Herman & Woods, § C
|-
| Sacrifice || 28 || The baron sat in his lordly seat || Singers in the Shadows || 1970 ||  ||  ||  || 
|-
| The Sacrifice || 8 || Her face was white, the naked girl they sat || Yesteryear #4 || 1989-10 Oct 1989 ||  ||  || Letter: Tevis Clyde Smith, c. February 1929 ; Third poem in the cycle "The Mysteries" ||  
|-
|  A Saga of Bjorn The Dane  ||  ||  || n/a || n/a  ||  ||  ||  Lost || Thom, Herman & Woods, § C
|-
| Sailor || 8 || I saw a mermaid sporting in the bay || The Last of the Trunk Och Brev I Urval || 2007-03 Mar 2007 ||  ||  Wikisource || Letter: Tevis Clyde Smith, June 23, 1926 ; PD || 
|-
|  Sam Bass || 8+2 || Sam Bass was born in Indiana, that was his native home / He always drank good liquor wherever he might be! || A Means to Freedom: The Letters of H. P. Lovecraft and Robert E. Howard  Volume 1: 1930–1932 ||  2011 ||  || https://www.youtube.com/watch?v=6ouJPYL9tqI ||  Mnemonic reconstruction  From a letter to H. P. Lovecraft, ca. January 1931 /In addition, a couplet is embedded in the story "Drums of the Sunset" (a.k.a. "Riders of the Sunset")
First published in The Cross Plains Review, November 1928–January 1929 (in 9 parts) ||  
|-
| Samson's Brooding || 20 || I will go down to Philistia  || Shadows of Dreams || 1989 ||  ||  || Letter: Tevis Clyde Smith, c. August 1932  || 
|-
| San Jacinto (1) || 12 || Flowers bloom on San Jacinto || Shadows of Dreams || 1989 ||  ||  Wikisource || Letter: Tevis Clyde Smith, June 23, 1926 ; PD || 
|-
| San Jacinto (2) || 32 || Red fields of glory || The Last of the Trunk Och Brev I Urval || 2007-03 Mar 2007 ||  ||  ||  || 
|-
| Sand-Hills' Crest, The || 39 || Here where the post oaks crown the ridge, and the dreary sand-drifts lie || A Robert E. Howard Memorial: June 13–15, 1986 || 1986 ||  ||  || Tentative title  || 
|-
|  Sandford Burns || 48 || My name it is Sandford Burns || The Collected Letters of Robert E. Howard, Volume 1: 1923-1929 || 2007-06 Jun 2007 || "The State of Arkansaw"; || https://www.youtube.com/watch?v=_mAnoTTyGqY; https://www.youtube.com/watch?v=XIU-7G7txmo || Mnemonic reconstruction of "The State of Arkansaw"; Letter: Robert W. Gordon, February 15, 1926; NOT INCLUDED IN COLLECTED POETRY ||
|-
| Sands of the Desert, The || 4 || A sea of molten silver || Dragonfields #3 || 1980-06-21 Summer 1980 || Untitled ("A sea of molten silver") ||  || Dragonfields is a Canadian chapbook ; Tentative title  || 
|-
| Sands of Time, The || 12 || Slow sift the sands of Time; the yellowed leaves || The Howard Collector #1Fire and Sleet and Candlelight || 1961-06-21 Summer 19611961 || Untitled ("Slow shifts the sands of time ...") ||  Wikisource || Conflict: , Fire and Sleet and Candlelight, 1961/, The Howard Collector, 1961; Letter: Harold Preece, November 24, 1930 ; Originally untitled ; PD || 
|-
| Sang the King of Midian || 24 || These I will give to you, Astair: an armlet of frozen gold || Weird Tales || 1930-04 Apr 1930 || Song Out of Midian ||  Wikisource || Letter: Tevis Clyde Smith; undated) || 
|-
|  The Sapayat of Omarge Gayhim  ||  ||  || n/a || n/a ||  ||  || Lost || Thom, Herman & Woods, § C
|-
|  A sappe ther wos and that a crumbe manne  || 16 || A sappe ther wos and that a crumbe manne || The Collected Letters of Robert E. Howard, Volume 1: 1923-1929 || 2007-06 Jun 2007 || Untitled: A sappe ther wos and that a crumbe manne ||  Wikisource || Letter: Tevis Clyde Smith, c. November 1928 ; PD Parody of the section of Chaucer's Prologue to the Canterbury Tales involving the Knight ("A knyght ther was, and that a worthy man ...")|| 
|-
|  Sappho, the Grecian hills are gold  || 4 || Sappho, the Grecian hills are gold || The Last of the Trunk Och Brev I Urval || 2007-03 Mar 2007 || Untitled: Sappho, the Grecian hills are gold ||  Wikisource   || Letter: Tevis Clyde Smith, c. November–December 1928 ; PD || 
|-
|  Saul Falls On His Sword  ||  ||  || n/a || n/a ||  ||  || Lost || Thom, Herman & Woods, § C
|-
|  Scarlet and gold are the stars tonight  || 8 || Scarlet and gold are the stars tonight || The Cross Plainsman || 2004-08 Aug 2004 (last four lines only) / The Collected Letters of Robert E. Howard, Volume 1: 1923-1929 (first full appearance)|| Adventures; Untitled: Scarlet and gold are the stars tonight ||  Wikisource || Letter: Tevis Clyde Smith, c. November 1928 ; PD || 
|-
| Scarlet Citadel, The || 18 + a prose proverb ||  || Weird Tales || January 1933 ||  || || verse headings for the CONAN story of the same name: The verse heading for Chapter 1 is titled "Old Ballad" (6 lines); Chapter 2 is "The Road of Kings" (4 lines); Chapter 3 is the second part of "Old Ballad" (6 lines); Chapter 4 has a short proverb ("The sword that slays the king cuts the cords of the empire."); and Chapter 5 is "Song of the Bossonian Archers" (2 lines)  || 
|-
| "The scarlet standards of the sun"  || 64 || The scarlet standards of the sun || The Ghost Ocean and Other Poems of the Supernatural || 1982 || Adventurer's Mistress, The (1); Untitled ("The scarlet standards of the sun") ||  || a draft version with a different 4th stanza is found in the notes of COLLECTED POETRY
 || Thom, Herman & Woods, § A
|-
|  The Scouts Lament || 40 || Come all of you, my brother scouts || The Collected Letters of Robert E. Howard, Volume 1: 1923-1929 || 2007-06 Jun 2007 || ||  || Mnemonic reconstruction of "The Old Scouts' Lament" by John A. Lomax; virtually identical to original  Letter: Robert W. Gordon, March 17, 1927; NOT INCLUDED IN COLLECTED POETRY ||
|-
| Sea, The || 48 || The sea, the sea, the rolling sea || The Baylor United StatementThe Cross Plains Review || 1923-06-29 Spring 192329 June 1923||  ||  Wikisource || Conflict:  Cross Plains Review, 1923/, The Baylor United Statement, 1923; PD || 
|-
| Sea and the Sunrise, The || 8 || The dawn on the ocean is rising || A Rhyme of Salem Town and Other Poems || 2002 ||  ||  ||  || 
|-
| Sea-Chant || 4 || Topaz seas and laughing skies || A Rhyme of Salem Town and Other Poems || 2002 || Untitled ("Topaz seas and laughing skies") ||  || Tentative title  || 
|-
| Sea-Girl, The || 24 || My love is the girl of the jade green gown || Whispers #4 || 1974-07 Jul 1974 ||  ||  ||  || 
|-
| "A sea of molten silver" || 4 || A sea of molten silver || Dragonfields #3 || 1980-06-21 Summer 1980 || Sands of the Desert, The; Untitled ("A sea of molten silver") ||  || Dragonfields is a Canadian chapbook ; Tentative title  || 
|-
|  Sea Slumber  ||  ||  || n/a || n/a ||  ||  || Lost || Thom, Herman & Woods, § C
|-
| Sea-Woman, The || 16 || The wild sea is beating || Singers in the Shadows || 1970 ||  ||  ||  || 
|-
|  The Search  || 27 || They came to a village which lay / Within a king's domains || The Collected Letters of Robert E. Howard, Volume 1: 1923-1929 || 2007-06 Jun 2007 || Untitled: ("They came to a village which lay / Within a king's domains ...") ||  || Mnemonic reconstruction of "The Search" by Edgar Lee Masters; Letter: Robert W. Gordon, February 4, 1925; NOT INCLUDED IN COLLECTED POETRY ||
|-
| Secrets || 58 || There is a serpent lifts his crest o' nights  || The Collected Letters of Robert E. Howard, Volume 1: 1923-1929 || 2007-06 Jun 2007 ||  ||  Wikisource || Letter: Tevis Clyde Smith, c. March 1928 ; PD || 
|-
|  The Seekers And The Dreamer  ||  ||  || n/a || n/a ||  ||  || Lost || Thom, Herman & Woods, § C
|-
| Senor Zorro || 41 || In the olden days of ancient lore || A Rhyme of Salem Town and Other Poems || 2002 ||  ||  || An early work  || 
|-
|  The Sepoy  ||  ||  || n/a || n/a ||  ||  || Lost || Thom, Herman & Woods, § C
|-
| Serpent || 25 || I am the symbol of Creation and Destruction || The Last of the Trunk Och Brev I Urval || 2007-03 Mar 2007 ||  ||  Wikisource || Letter: Tevis Clyde Smith, June 23, 1926 ; PD || 
|-
| Seven Kings || 16 || Seven kings of the grey old cities || Fantasy Tales #11 || 1982-12-21 Winter 1982 || Untitled ("Seven kings of the grey old cities") ||  || British ; Tentative title  || 
|- style="background:#E0E0E0;"
| "Seven kings of the grey old cities" || 16 || Seven kings of the grey old cities || Fantasy Tales #11 || 1982-12-21 Winter 1982 || Seven Kings; Untitled ("Seven kings of the grey old cities") ||  || British ; Tentative title  || 
|-
| Seven-Up Ballad, The || 30 || Carl Macon was a kollege kid of far and wide renown || Costigan Special #1 || 1982-11 Nov 1982 ||  ||  || Costigan Special was distributed as part of REHUPA #60  || 
|-
|  The shades of night were falling faster  || 6 || The shades of night were falling faster || The Last of the Trunk Och Brev I Urval || 2007-03 Mar 2007 || Untitled: The shades of night were falling faster ||   Wikisource || Letter: Tevis Clyde Smith, April 14, 1926 ; PD || 
|-
| Shadow of Dreams || 39 || Stay not from me, that veil  || Poet's Scroll || 1929-08 Aug 1929 || Stay Not From Me; Untitled ("Stay not from me, that veil ...") ||  Wikisource || Pen name: Patrick Howard  ; Letter: Tevis Clyde Smith, c. December 1928 ; PD [NOT to be confused with SHADOWS OF DREAMS!] || 
|-
| Shadow of the Beast, The || 4 || As long as evil stars arise ||  ||  ||  ||  || Epigraph: The Shadow of the Beast  || 
|-
| Shadow Thing || 28 || There was a thing of the shadow world || The Ghost Ocean and Other Poems of the Supernatural || 1982 || Untitled ("There was a thing of the shadow world") ||  || Tentative title ; From: Untitled, begins "As he approached the two..." / || 
|-
| Shadows (1) || 20 || A black moon nailed against a sullen dawn || n/a || n/a ||  ||  Wikisource || Part 1 of 5 in the Black Dawn cycle ; Never published separately  || 
|-
| Shadows (2) || 14 || Grey ghost, dim ghost || Singers in the Shadows || 1970 ||  ||  ||   || 
|-
| Shadows (3) || 20 || I am that which was, was never || The Last of the Trunk Och Brev I Urval || 2007-03 Mar 2007 ||  ||  Wikisource || Letter: Tevis Clyde Smith, June 23, 1926 ; PD || 
|-
| Shadows from Yesterday || 28 || Ages ago, in the dawn of Time, I looked on a man with hate || The Ghost Ocean and Other Poems of the Supernatural || 1982 ||  ||  ||  || 
|-
| Shadows of Dreams || 102 || Men sing of poets who leave their sheets || Shadows of Dreams || 1989 ||  ||  || Letter: Tevis Clyde Smith, undated ; NOT to be confused with SHADOW OF DREAMS! || 
|-
| Shadows on the Road || 46 || Nial of Ulster, welcome home || Weird Tales || 1930-05 May 1930 ||  ||  "Shadows on the Road" ||  || 
|-
| "She came in the dim of the desert dawn ..." || 36 || She came in the dim of the desert dawn || Lone Star Universe || 1976 || Coming of Bast, The; Untitled: "She came in the dim of the desert dawn ..." ||  || Letter: Tevis Clyde Smith, undated, a version  || Thom, Herman & Woods, § C
|-
| "She came in the grey of the desert dawn ..." || 46 || She came in the grey of the desert dawn || The Collected Letters Of Robert E. Howard, Volume 3: 1933–1936 || 2008 || Coming of Bast, The--draft; Untitled: "She came in the grey of the desert dawn ..." ||  || Letter: Tevis Clyde Smith, undated, beginning "Ha, Ha! Your not going ..."  || Thom, Herman & Woods, § C
|-
|  The Shellback's Prayer  ||  ||  || n/a || n/a ||  ||  || Lost || Thom, Herman & Woods, § C
|-
| Ships || 22 || There's a far, lone island in the dim, red west || Weird Tales || 1938-07 Jul 1938 ||  ||  "Ships" || Lines 1–4 identical to lines 1–4 of "The Isle of Hy-Brasil"; lines 5–22 identical to lines 20–38 of the same; all the lines from this poem are included in "The Isle of Hy-Brasil", which is slightly longer, with just a few word changes  || 
|-
| Shrines || 26 || Mohammed, Buddha, Moses, Satan, Thor!  ||  ||  ||  ||  || Part 3 of 5 in the Black Dawn cycle ; Never published separately  || 
|-
| Sighs in the Yellow Leaves || 20 || I took an ivory grinning joss || The Last of the Trunk Och Brev I Urval || 2007-03 Mar 2007 ||  ||   Wikisource  || Letter: Tevis Clyde Smith, undated ; PD || 
|-
| Sign of the Sickle, The || 10 || Flashing sickle and falling grain || A Rhyme of Salem Town and Other Poems || 2002 ||  ||  || Shares lines with Timur-langd  || 
|-
| Silence Falls on Mecca's Walls || 30 || Silence Falls on Mecca's Walls || Cthulhu the Mythos and Kindred Horrors || 1987-05 May 1987 || Untitled ("Silence falls on Mecca's walls") ||  || Originally untitled ; Letter: Tevis Clyde Smith, c. December 1928  || 
|-
| Singer in the Mist, The || 14 || At birth a witch laid on me monstrous spells || Weird Tales || 1938-04 Apr 1938 || Singer in the Mist, A ||  "The Singer in the Mist" || First poem of five from the  Sonnets Out of Bedlam cycle;  || 
|-
| Singing Hemp || 16 || Aslaf sat in the dragon bows || Verses in Ebony || 1975 ||  ||  ||  || 
|-
| Singing in the Wind || 44 || Singing joy, singing joy || The JuntoThe Howard Collector #14 || 1929-07 Jul 1929Spring 1971 ||  ||  || Conflict: , The Howard Collector, 1971/, The Junto, 1929 || 
|-
| Skull in the Clouds, The || 42 || The Black Prince scowled above his lance, and wrath in his hot eyes lay || The JuntoThe Howard Collector #2 || 1929-08 Aug 1929Spring 1962 || Reuben's Birthright ||  Wikisource || Conflict: , The Howard Collector, 1962/, The Junto, 1929; PD || 
|-
| Skull of Silence, The || 6 || —And a dozen death-blots blotched him || Seanchai #82 || 1997-08 Aug 1997 ||  ||  || From: The Skull of Silence verse heading (not published in its first printing) ; Distributed as part of REHUPA #146  || 
|-
| Skulls || 24 || Oh, ye who dine on evil wine || Fantasy Book || 1984-09 Sep 1984 ||  ||  ||  || 
|- 
| Skulls Against the Dawn || 32 || Oh, who comes down the mountain, a stalking oak at morning  ||  ||  || Skulls  Over Judah ||  || there are two slightly different versions, each with one of the alternative names || 
|-
| Skulls and Dust || 23 || The Persian slaughtered the Apis Bull || American Poet || 1929-05 May 1929 ||  ||  Wikisource || Pen name: Patrick Howard ; PD; Won $3 prize for best poem in that issue of American Poet  || 
|-
| Skulls and Orchids || (1,795 words) || Surely it was in decadent Athens—in marble-throned Athens of Sophocles in the Periclean Age. || Etchings in Ivory (Chapbook) || 1968 ||  ||  || Second "prose poem" in the Etchings in Ivory cycle ||
|-
| Skulls Over Judah || 16 || Oh, who comes down the mountain, a stalking oak at morning || The Howard Collector #9 || 1967-03-21 Spring 1967 || Skulls Against the Dawn ||  || Letter: Tevis Clyde Smith, undated ;there are two slightly different versions, each with one of the alternative names || 
|-
|  Slaves  ||  ||  || n/a || n/a ||  ||  || Lost, different line count from "The Slaves" || Thom, Herman & Woods, § C
|-
|  The Slaves  ||  ||  || n/a || n/a ||  ||  || Lost, different line count from "Slaves" || Thom, Herman & Woods, § C
|-
| Slayer, The || 24 || The women come and the women go || A Rhyme of Salem Town and Other Poems || 2002 || Untitled ("The women come and the women go") ||  Wikisource   || Letter: Tevis Clyde Smith, c. December 1928 ; PD  || 
|-
| "Slow shifts the sands of time ..." || 12 || Slow sift the sands of Time; the yellowed leaves || The Howard Collector #1Fire and Sleet and Candlelight || 1961-06-21 Summer 19611961 || Sands of Time, The; Untitled ("Slow shifts the sands of time ...") ||  Wikisource || Conflict: , Fire and Sleet and Candlelight, 1961/, The Howard Collector, 1961; Letter: Harold Preece, November 24, 1930 ; Originally untitled ; PD || 
|-
| Slugger's Vow || 9 || How your right thudded on my jaw || Robert E. Howard's Fight Magazine #4 || 1996-10 Oct 1996 || Untitled ("How your right thudded on my jaw") ||  || Letter: Tevis Clyde Smith, January 30, 1925  || 
|-
| Slumber || 28 || A silver scroll against a marble sky || Magazine of Horror #30 || 1969-12 Dec 1969 ||  ||  ||  || 
|-
| "The snow-capped peaks of Ural ..." || 20 || The snow-capped peaks of Ural shone white against the sky || A Rhyme of Salem Town and Other Poems || 2002 || Tartar Raid, The; Untitled ("The snow-capped peaks of Ural ...") ||  || Tentative title ; Unfinished  || 
|-
|  A Soldier's Memories  ||  ||  || n/a || n/a ||  ||  || Lost || Thom, Herman & Woods, § C
|-
| Solomon Kane's Homecoming (1) || 44 || The white gulls wheeled above the cliffs, the air was slashed with foam || Fanciful Tales || 1936-09-21 Fall 1936 || The Home-Coming Of Solomon; Solomon's Home-coming ||  Wikisource || Original version; A Solomon Kane poem; PD || 
|-
| Solomon Kane's Homecoming (2) || The white gulls wheeled above the cliffs, the wind was slashed with foam, ||  || The Howard Collector #15 || 1971-09-21 Fall 1971 ||  ||  || A slightly different version of the poem; A Solomon Kane poem || 
|- style="background:#E0E0E0;"
| Solomon's Home-coming
|-
| Something About Eve || 4 || Bugles beckon to red disaster || Echoes From An Iron Harp || 1972 ||  ||  || Epigraph: Something About Eve / || 
|-
| Son of Spartacus, A || 24 || I pinned him hard in an empty trench || The Dark Man #6 || 2001-06-21 Summer 2001 ||  ||  ||  || 
|-
| Song at Midnight (1)|| 28 || I heard an old gibbet that crowned a bare hill || The Phantagraph || 1940-08 Aug 1940 || Man, the Master ||   Wikisource || PD || 
|-
| Song at Midnight (2) (SPURIOUS RETITLING?)|| 10 || I saw a man going down a long trail || Robert E. Howard Foundation Newsletter Volume 5 Number 3  || Fall 2011 || Man, The Master ||   Wikisource || PD  Alternative only mentioned in  || 
|-
| Song Before Clontarf || 12 || Lean on your sword, red-bearded lord, and watch your victims crawl || The Howard Review #2 || 1975-03 Mar 1975 ||  ||  || Letter: Harold Preece, March 24, 1930  || 
|-
|  A Song for All Exiles  ||  ||  || n/a || n/a ||  ||  || Lost || Thom, Herman & Woods, § C
|-
| Song for All Woman, A || 20 || Man run naked and free and bold || Night Images (deluxe edition) || 1976 || Swings and Swings ||  ||  || 
|-
| Song for Men that Laugh, A || 24 || Satan is my brother, Satan is my son || The JuntoMagazine of Horror #16 || 1928-12 Dec 1928Summer 1967 ||  ||  || Conflict: , Magazine of Horror, 1967/, The Junto, 1928 || 
|-
| Song from an Ebony Heart, A || 44 || The wine in my cup is bitter dregs  || Shadows of Dreams || 1989 || Untitled ("The wine in my cup is bitter dregs ...") ||  || Letter: Tevis Clyde Smith; c. November 1928) || 
|-
| Song from the Outer Dark, A || 24 || My ruthless hands still clutch at life || Kadath #1 || 1974 || Word from the Outer Dark, A ||  || Pen name: Patrick Howard  || 
|-
| Song of a Fugitive Bard || 30 || They gave me a dollar and thirty cents when they let me outa my cell || Shadows of Dreams || 1989 || Untitled ("They gave me a dollar and thirty cents when they let me outa my cell. ...") ||  || Letter: Tevis Clyde Smith; c. June 1928) || 
|-
| Song of a Mad Minstrel, The || 32 || I am the thorn in the foot, I am the blur in the sight || Weird Tales || 1931-02 Feb-March 1931 ||  ||  "The Song of a Mad Minstrel" ||  || 
|-
|  The Song of a Worshipper  ||  ||  || n/a || n/a ||  ||  || Lost || Thom, Herman & Woods, § C
|-
| Song of Bards, A || 5 || Chesterton twanged on his lyre || A Rhyme of Salem Town and Other Poems || 2002 || Untitled ("Chesterton twanged on his lyre") ||  || Tentative title  || 
|-
| Song of Bêlit, The || 23 || "Believe green buds awaken in the spring ..."; "In that dead citadel of crumbling stone ..."; "Was it a dream the nighted lotus brought? ..."; "The shadows were black around him ..."; "Now we are done with roaming, evermore ...") || Always Comes Evening || 1957 || Queen of the Black Coast ||  || Epigraph: Queen of the Black Coast  || 
|-
| Song of Bran, The || 4 || The Caesar lolled on his ivory throne || Always Comes Evening || 1957 || Kings of the Night ||  || Epigraph: Kings of the Night  || 
|-
| Song of Cheer, A || 22 || I was his mistress, she was his wife; that was the difference it made  || The Last of the Trunk Och Brev I Urval || 2007-03 Mar 2007 ||  ||  Wikisource || Letter: Tevis Clyde Smith; c. March 1928); PD || 
|-
| Song of College, A || 24 || Now is chapel gathered, now the seats are full  || The Last of the Trunk Och Brev I Urval || 2007-03 Mar 2007 ||  ||   Wikisource  || Letter: Tevis Clyde Smith; undated); PD || 
|-
| Song of Defeat, A || 28 || We are they || Magazine of Horror #34 || 1970-09-21 Fall 1970 || Untitled ("We are they") ||  || Originally untitled  || 
|-
| Song of Greenwich, A || 20 || The lords of Greenwich sallied forth  || The Last of the Trunk Och Brev I Urval || 2007-03 Mar 2007 ||  ||   Wikisource  || Letter: Tevis Clyde Smith; undated); PD || 
|-
| Song of Horsa's Galley, The || 16 || From the Baltic Sea our galleys sweep || The Howard Collector #13 || 1970-09-21 Autumn 1970 ||  ||  || Lines 1-4 similar to lines 33-36 of The Dust Dance (version 1)  || 
|-
| Song of Murtagh O'Brien, The  || 22 || The moon above the Kerry hills had risen scarce a span || Always Comes Evening || 1957 || Black Michael's Story; Retribution; Untitled ("The moon above the Kerry hills ...") ||  "Retribution" || Titled 'Retribution from an untitled draft, Howard's original title The Song of Murtagh O'Brien was found on a later copy  || 
|-
|  A Song of Omar  ||  ||  || n/a || n/a ||  ||  || Lost || Thom, Herman & Woods, § C
|-
| Song of Skel Thorwald's Son, The || 4 || We shall not see the hills again where the grey cloud limns the oak ||  ||  ||  ||  || Epigraph: The Road of Azrael  || 
|-
| Song of the Anchor Chain, A || 52 || Let down, let out the anchor  || Shadows of Dreams || 1989 ||  ||  || Letter: Tevis Clyde Smith; c. November 1928) || 
|-
| Song of the Bats, The || 21 || The dusk was on the mountain || Weird Tales || 1927-05 May 1927 ||  ||  Wikisource || PD || 
|-
| Song of the Bossonian Archers || 2 || A long bow and a strong bow, and let the sky grow dark || Always Comes Evening || 1957 || The Scarlet Citadel (verse heading for Chapter 5) ||  || Epigraph: The Scarlet Citadel  || 
|-
|  The Song of The Bull-Moose  ||  ||  || n/a || n/a ||  ||  || Lost || Thom, Herman & Woods, § C
|-
| Song of the Don Cossacks, A || 26 || Wolf-brother, wolf-lover || Always Comes Evening || 1957 ||  ||  "A Song of the Don Cossacks" ||  || 
|-
| Song of the Gallows Tree, The || 24 || Worn am I by the winds and the rains || Weird Tales #2 || 1981 ||  ||  ||  || 
|-
| Song of the Jackal, The || 26 || I haunt the halls where the lichen clings || Night Images || 1976 ||  ||  ||  || 
|-
| Song of the Last Briton, The || 16 || The sea is grey in the death of day || The Ghost Ocean and Other Poems of the Supernatural || 1982 ||  ||  ||  || 
|-
| Song of the Legions, A || 40 || The crystal gong of the silence || The Howard Collector #12 || 1970-03-21 Spring 1970 ||  ||  ||  || 
|-
| Song of the Naked Lands, A || 92 || You lolled in gardens where breezes fanned || A Song of the Naked Lands || 1973 || Untitled ("You lolled in gardens where breezes fanned") ||  || Originally untitled  || 
|-
| Song of the Pict || 14 || Wolf on the height || Always Comes Evening || 1957 ||  ||  "Song of the Pict" || From: Men of the Shadows ; Originally untitled  || 
|-
| Song of the Race, A || 72 || High on this throne sat Bran Mak Morn || Bran Mak Morn || 1969-09 Sep 1969 || Untitled ("High on his throne sat Bran Mak Morn") ||  || Originally untitled ; A Bran Mak Morn poem || 
|-
| Song of the Red Stone, The || 10 || It shows on the breast of the Persian king || Echoes From An Iron Harp || 1972 || The Blood of Belshazzar ||  || Epigraph: The Blood of Belshazzar ; Verse heading of short story "The Blood of Belshazzar," starring Cormac Fitzgeoffrey || 
|-
| Song of the Sage, The || 4 || Thus spoke Scutto on the mountains in the twilight || The Collected Letters of Robert E. Howard, Volume 2: 1930-1932 || 2007-10 Oct 2007 ||  ||   Wikisource || Letter: Tevis Clyde Smith; c. March 1930); PD || 
|-
| Song of the Werewolf Folk, A || 24 || Sink white fangs in the throat of Life || Etchings and Odysseys #10 || 1987 ||  ||  ||  || 
|-
| Song of Yar Ali Khan, The || 20 || This is the song of Yar Ali Khan || Always Comes Evening(Underwood-Miller) || 1977 ||  ||  || An early work  || 
|-
| Song Out of Midian, A || 24 || These I will give to you, Astair: an armlet of frozen gold || Weird Tales || 1930-04 Apr 1930 || Sang the King of Midian ||  Wikisource || Letter: Tevis Clyde Smith; undated) || 
|-
| Song Out of the East, A || 22 || Allah || Night Images || 1976 ||  ||  ||  || 
|-
| Songs of Bastards || 559 || Oh, the years they pass / like a bleak jackass || Lewd Tales || 1987 ||  ||  || Letter: Tevis Clyde Smith, c. March 1929 ; A play ("One of the Greatest Operas Never Yet Produced Anywhere") written entirely in verse' contains the following poems: Untitled ("I knocked upon her lattice – soft!"); Untitled ("Let us up in the hills ..."); Untitled ("Life is a lot of hooey"); Untitled ("Men are toys ...")|| 
|-
| Sonnet of Good Cheer, A || 14 || Fling wide the portals, rose-lipped dawn has come || The Howard Collector #9 || 1967-03-21 Spring 1967 ||  ||  ||  || 
|-
| Sonnets Out of Bedlam || Five 14-line sonnets for a total of 70 lines ||  ||  ||  ||  ||  || A cycle of five poems: "The Singer in the Mist" (14 lines), "The Dream and the Shadow" (14 lines), "The Soul-Eater" (14 lines), "Haunting Columns" (14 lines), and "The Last Hour" (14 lines)  || 
|-
| Sonora to Del Rio || 20 || Sonora to Del Rio is a hundred barren miles || The Howard Collector #1 || 1961-06-21 Summer 1961 ||  ||  Wikisource || Shares lines with The Grim Land ; PD || 
|-
| Soul-Eater, The || 14 || I swam below the surface of a lake || Weird Tales || 1937-08 Aug 1937 ||  ||  "The Soul-Eater" || Third poem of five from the  Sonnets Out of Bedlam cycle;  || 
|-
|  The South Sea Trader  ||  ||  || n/a || n/a ||  ||  || Lost || Thom, Herman & Woods, § C
|- 
| Sowers of the Thunder, The || 8 || Iron winds and ruin and flame ||  ||  || last eight lines of the 15-line The Ballad of Baibars ||  || verse heading to the story of the same name; || 
|-
|  The spiders of weariness come on me  || 4 || The spiders of weariness come on me || The Collected Letters of Robert E. Howard, Volume 1: 1923-1929 || 2007-06 Jun 2007 || Untitled: The spiders of weariness come on me ||  Wikisource || Letter: Tevis Clyde Smith, c. March 1928 ; PD || 
|-
|  Stanley Ketchell  ||  ||  || n/a || n/a ||  ||  || Lost; two different drafts listed || Thom, Herman & Woods, § C
|-
| "The stars beat up from the shadowy sea" || 28 || The stars beat up from the shadowy sea || Always Comes Evening || 1957 || Heart of the Sea's Desire, The; Mate of the Sea; Untitled: "The stars beat up from the shadowy sea" ||  "The Heart of the Sea's Desire" || Title created by Dale Hart for an untitled version but another draft was later found with the title Mate of the Sea  ||  
|-
| "The State of Arkansaw" || 48 || My name it is Sandford Burns || The Collected Letters of Robert E. Howard, Volume 1: 1923-1929 || 2007-06 Jun 2007 || Sandford Burns; || https://www.youtube.com/watch?v=_mAnoTTyGqY; https://www.youtube.com/watch?v=XIU-7G7txmo || Mnemonic reconstruction of "The State of Arkansaw"; Letter: Robert W. Gordon, February 15, 1926; NOT INCLUDED IN COLLECTED POETRY ||
|-
| Stay Not From Me || 39 || Stay not from me, that veil  || Poet's Scroll || 1929-08 Aug 1929 || Shadow of Dreams; Untitled ("Stay not from me, that veil ...")||  Wikisource || Pen name: Patrick Howard  ; Letter: Tevis Clyde Smith, c. December 1928 ; PD [NOT to be confused with SHADOWS OF DREAMS!] || 
|-  style="background:#E0E0E0;"
| "Stay not from me, that veil ..." || 39 || Stay not from me, that veil  || Poet's Scroll || 1929-08 Aug 1929 || Shadow of Dreams; Stay Not From MeUntitled ("Stay not from me, that veil ...")||  Wikisource || Pen name: Patrick Howard  ; Letter: Tevis Clyde Smith, c. December 1928 ; PD [NOT to be confused with SHADOWS OF DREAMS!] || 
|-
| Stirring of Green Leaves, A || 16 || I long for the South as a man for a maid || Shadows of Dreams || 1989 ||  ||  || Letter: Tevis Clyde Smith; c. May 1930)  || 
|-
| Stralsund, The || 5 || He has rigged her and tricked her || A Rhyme of Salem Town and Other Poems || 2002 || Untitled ("He has rigged her and tricked her") ||  || Tentative title  || 
|-
| Strange Passion || 34 || Ah, I know the black queens whose passions blaze || Risque Stories #1 || 1984-03 Mar 1984 || Untitled ("Ah, I know black queens ...") ||  || Tentative title  || 
|-
|  Strangeness  ||  ||  || n/a || n/a ||  ||  || Lost || Thom, Herman & Woods, § C
|-
| Stranger, The || 28 || The wind blew in from seaward || Singers in the Shadows || 1970 ||  ||  ||  || 
|-
| "A sturdy housewife was Mistress Brown ..." || 20 || A sturdy housewife was Mistress Brown || Desire and Other Erotic Poems || 1989 || Good Mistress Brown; Untitled ("A sturdy housewife was Mistress Brown ...") ||  || Tentative title  || 
|-
|  Sullivan  ||  ||  || n/a || n/a ||  ||  || Lost; possibly a variation of the poem "John L. Sullivan" || Thom, Herman & Woods, § C
|-
| Summer Morn || 5 || Am-ra stood on a mountain height || Kull: Exile of Atlantis || 2006-10 Oct 2006 || Untitled ("Am-ra stood on a mountain height") ||   Wikisource || Tentative title ; PD || 
|-
| Surrender (1) || 44 || I will rise some day when the day is done || The JuntoThe Howard Collector #3 || 1929-08 Aug 1929Autumn 1962 || The Road to Rest ||  Wikisource || PD; Conflict: , The Howard Collector, 1962/, The Junto, 1929 || 
|-
| Surrender (2) || 20 || Open the window and let me go || Shadows of Dreams || 1989 ||  ||  || Letter: Tevis Clyde Smith; undated)  || 
|-
| Swamp Murder || 20 || Through the mists and damps || Verses in Ebony || 1975 ||  ||  ||  || 
|-
| "Swift with your mitts" || 8 || Swift with your mitts and fast on your feet || A Rhyme of Salem Town and Other Poems || 2002 || Time, the Victor; Untitled ("Swift with your mitts") ||  || Tentative title ; Unfinished  || 
|-
|  Swine  ||  ||  || n/a || n/a || || || Lost || Thom, Herman & Woods, § C
|-
| Swings and Swings || 56 || "Swing your girl in a grape vine swing?" || The Junto || 1930-12-31 unknown (c. 1928-30) || Song for All Women, A ||  || Howard's Foreword: Once upon a time I heard a girl make a speech; and, lo, she bid all youths to swing their girls in grape vine swings if they wished to win them.
 || 
|-
| Sword of Lal Singh, The || 24 || Men I have slain with naked steel || A Rhyme of Salem Town and Other Poems || 2002 || Untitled (Men I have slain with naked steel) ||  || Tentative title ; An early work  || 
|-
| Sword of Mohammed, The ||  ||  || The Toreador || 1925-07-05 5 July 1925 ||  ||  ||  || 
|-
| Sword Woman verse heading for Chapter 3 || 5 || Beyond the creak of rat-gnawed beams in squalid peasant huts || n/a || n/a ||  ||  || Epigraph: Drums in My Ears  Never published separately  || 
|-
| Sword Woman verse heading for Chapter 4 || 4 || Her sisters bend above their looms || n/a || n/a || Alternate title: verse heading for Chapter 4 of "Sword Woman"; Ballad of Dark Agnes, The;  ||  || Epigraph:   Never published separately from the story  || Thom, Herman & Woods, § B
|-
|  Swords glimmered up the pass  || 93 || Swords glimmered up the pass || The Collected Letters of Robert E. Howard, Volume 1: 1923-1929 || 2007-06 Jun 2007 || Untitled: Swords glimmered up the pass ||  Wikisource || Letter: Tevis Clyde Smith, c. November 1928 ; PD || 
|-
| Symbol, The || 24 || Eons before Atlantean days in the time of the world's black dawn || Ariel || 1976-09-21 Autumn 1976 || Untitled ("Eons before the Atlantean days ...") ||  || Tentative title  || 
|-
| Symbols || 8 || Scarce had the east grown red with dawn  || Shadows of Dreams || 1989 ||  ||  ||  Letter: Tevis Clyde Smith, c. January 1928  || 
|-
|  Take some honey from a cat  || 5 || Take some honey from a cat || The Last of the Trunk Och Brev I Urval || 2007-03 Mar 2007 || Untitled: Take some honey from a cat || Wikisource  || Letter: Tevis Clyde Smith, c. August–September 1927 ; PD || 
|-
|  The Tale of Our Lives  ||  ||  || n/a || n/a ||  ||  || Lost || Thom, Herman & Woods, § C
|-
| Tale the Dead Slaver Told, The || 22 || Dim and grey was the silent sea || Weirdbook #8 || 1974 || The Dead Slaver's Tale ||  ||  || 
|-
| The tall man answered / The tall man rose and said / The tall man said ||  ||  ||The Last of the Trunk Och Brev I Urval || 2007-03 Mar 2007|| from "People of the Winged Skulls," q, v. ||  ||  || 
|-
| Tarentella || 63 || Heads! Heads! Heads! || The Daniel Baker Collegian || 1926-5-25 25 May 1926 || Tarantella ||  Wikisource || PD || 
|-
| Tartar Raid, The || 20 || The snow-capped peaks of Ural shone white against the sky || A Rhyme of Salem Town and Other Poems || 2002 || Untitled ("The snow-capped peaks of Ural ...") ||  || Tentative title ; Unfinished  || 
|-
| Tavern, The || 14 || There stands, close by a dim, wolf-haunted wood || Singers in the Shadows || 1970 ||  ||  ||  || 
|-
| Tavern Song || 20 || Old Compass is dead and lies under the ground || The Collected Letters of Robert E. Howard, Volume 1: 1923-1929 || 2007-06 Jun 2007 || || https://www.youtube.com/watch?v=tJlykbm7nfU || Mnemonic reconstruction of "Oliver Cromwell Lies Buried and Dead"; Letter: Robert W. Gordon, April 9, 1926; NOT INCLUDED IN COLLECTED POETRY
|-
|  Tell me not in coocoo numbers  || 4 || Tell me not in coocoo numbers || The Collected Letters of Robert E. Howard, Volume 1: 1923-1929 || 2007-06 Jun 2007 || Untitled: Tell me not in coocoo numbers ||  || Letter: Tevis Clyde Smith, c. October 1927 ; From the story The Fastidious Fooey Mancucu  || 
|-
| Tempter, The || 40 || Something tapped me on the shoulder || The Cross Plains Review || 1937-06-18 18 June 1937 ||  ||  Wikisource || PD || 
|-
| "That is no land for weaklings ..." || 28 || That is no land for weaklings, no land for coward or fool || A Rhyme of Salem Town and Other Poems || 2002 || Zululand; Untitled ("That is no land for weaklings ...") ||  || Tentative title ; An early work  || 
|-
| That Women May Sing of Us || 8 || I have felt their eyes upon me || The Last of the Trunk Och Brev I Urval || 2007-03 Mar 2007 ||  ||  Wikisource || Letter: Tevis Clyde Smith; undated) ; PD || 
|-
|  Then Stein the peddler with rising joy  || 14 || Then Stein the peddler with rising joy || The Last of the Trunk Och Brev I Urval || 2007-03 Mar 2007 || Untitled: Then Stein the peddler with rising joy ||   Wikisource  || Letter: Tevis Clyde Smith, c. July 1930 ; PD || 
|-
| There are grim things did || 26 || There are grim things did, in the East, old kid || Chacal #1 || 1976-12-21 Winter 1976 || The Ballad of Naughty Nell; The Ballad of Singapore Nell; Untitled: ("There are grim things did ...") ||  ||draft from an undated letter to Tevis Clyde Smith, significantly different from the version published in CHACAL and DESIRE; the original typescript version is used for COLLECTED POETRY || Thom, Herman & Woods, § B
|-
| "There burns in me ..." || 4 || There burns in me no honeyed drop of love || Always Comes Evening || 1957 || Invective; Untitled ("There burns in me ...") ||  "Invective" ||  || 
|-
| "There come long days ..." || 21 || There come long days when the soul turns sick || Fantasy Tales || 1987-06-21 Summer 1987 || Outworn Story, An; Untitled ("There come long days ...") ||  || Tentative title ; British  || 
|-
| "There is a misty sea ..." || 6 || There is a misty sea beneath the earth || A Rhyme of Salem Town and Other Poems || 2002 || Misty Sea, A; Untitled ("There is a misty sea ...") ||  || Tentative title  || 
|-
| "There is a sea and a silent moon" || 16 || There is a sea and a silent moon || The Ghost Ocean and Other Poems of the Supernatural || 1982 || Ghost Ocean, The; Untitled ("There is a sea and a silent moon") ||  || Tentative title  || 
|-
| "There is a strangeness in my soul" || 60 || There is a strangeness in my soul || Rhymes of Death || 1975 || Ecstasy; Untitled ("There is a strangeness in my soul") ||  || Tentative title ; shares some stanzas with "A cringing woman's lot is hard" || 
|- 
|  There once was a wicked old elf  || 5 (limerick) || There once was a wicked old elf || The Last of the Trunk Och Brev I Urval || 2007-03 Mar 2007 || Untitled: There once was a wicked old elf ||   Wikisource  || Letter: Tevis Clyde Smith, undated ; PD || 
|-
| "There was a thing of the shadow world" || 28 || There was a thing of the shadow world || The Ghost Ocean and Other Poems of the Supernatural || 1982 || Shadow Thing; Untitled ("There was a thing of the shadow world") ||  || Tentative title ; From: Untitled, begins "As he approached the two..." / || 
|-
| "There was a young girl from Siberia" || 15 || There was a young girl from Siberia || Desire and Other Erotic Poems || 1989 || Limericks to Spank By; Untitled ("There was a young girl from Siberia") ||  || Tentative title ; Three 5-line limericks  || 
|- 
| "There was an old dick whose name was Stiff" || 2 4-line ditties for a total of 8 lines || "There was an old dick whose name was Stiff" || The Last of the Trunk Och Brev I Urval || 2007-03 Mar 2007 ||Untitled: ("There was an old dick whose name was Stiff") || Letter: Tevis Clyde Smith, ca. March 1929; contained in the untitled story "Hatrack!"; titled with the first line in COLLECTED POETRY ||  
|-
|  There were three lads who went their destined ways  || 53 || There were three lads who went their destined ways || The Last of the Trunk Och Brev I Urval || 2007-03 Mar 2007 || Untitled: There were three lads who went their destined ways ||  wikisource || Letter: Tevis Clyde Smith, undated ; PD || 
|-
| "There's a bell that hangs in a hidden cave" || 24 || There's a bell that hangs in a hidden cave || Bran Mak Morn — The Last King || 2001 || Bell of Morni, The; Untitled ("There's a bell that hangs in a hidden cave") ||  || Tentative title  || Thom, Herman & Woods, § B
|-
| "There's a calling, and a calling ..." || 8 || There's a calling and a calling || A Rhyme of Salem Town and Other Poems || 2002 || Calling to Rome, A; Untitled ||  || Tentative title  || Thom, Herman & Woods, § C
|-
|  There's an isle far away on the breast of the sea  || 24 || There's an isle far away on the breast of the sea || The Last of the Trunk Och Brev I Urval || 2007-03 Mar 2007 || Untitled: There's an isle far away on the breast of the sea ||  Wikisource || Letter: Tevis Clyde Smith, c. December 1928 ; PD || 
|-
| These Things Are Gods || 18 || These things are gods || Unaussprechlichen Kulten #2 || 1992-07 Jul 1992 ||  ||  || French  || 
|-
| "They break from the pack ..." || 24 || They break from the pack and seek their own track || A Rhyme of Salem Town and Other Poems || 2002 || Untamed Avatars; Untitled ("They break from the pack ...") ||  || Tentative title  || 
|-
| "They came to a village which lay / Within a king's domains" || 27 || They came to a village which lay / Within a king's domains || The Collected Letters of Robert E. Howard, Volume 1: 1923-1929 || 2007-06 Jun 2007 || The Search Untitled: ("They came to a village which lay / Within a king's domains ...") ||  || Mnemonic reconstruction of "The Search" by Edgar Lee Masters; Letter: Robert W. Gordon, February 4, 1925; NOT INCLUDED IN COLLECTED POETRY ||
|-
| "They cast her out of the court of the king ..." || 44 || They cast her out of the court of the king || Chacal #2 || 1977-03-21 Spring 1977 || Daughter of Evil; Untitled ("They cast her out of the court of the king ...") ||  || Letter: Tevis Clyde Smith, c. September 1930 ; Tentative title  || 
|-
| "They gave me a dollar and thirty cents  ..." || 30 || They gave me a dollar and thirty cents when they let me outa my cell || Shadows of Dreams || 1989 || Song of a Fugitive Bard; Untitled ("They gave me a dollar and thirty cents  ...") ||  || Letter: Tevis Clyde Smith; c. June 1928) || 
|-
|  They matched me up that night ... || 24 || They matched me up that night with a bird that was a fright || The Last of the Trunk Och Brev I Urval || 2007-03 Mar 2007 || Untitled: ("They matched me up that night ...") ||  Wikisource  || Letter: Tevis Clyde Smith, c. June 1928 ; PD || 
|-
|  They were there, in the distance dreaming  || 4 || They were there, in the distance dreaming || Dear HPL: Letters, Robert E. Howard to H. P. Lovecraft, 1933-1936 || 2002 || Untitled: They were there, in the distance dreaming ||  || Letter: H. P. Lovecraft, April 23, 1933  || 
|-
| Thing on the Roof, The || 8 || They lumber through the night || Echoes From An Iron Harp || 1972 || The Old Ones; Out of the Old Land ||  || Justin Geoffrey ; This is the published title, The Old Ones was the draft title, from The Thing on the Roof || 
|-
|  This is a young world  ||  || This is a young world || The Right Hook, vol. 1, #3 || 1925-03-23 1925 || Untitled: This is a young world ||  ||  || 
|-
| "This is the tale of a nameless fight" || 1,046 || This is the tale of a nameless fight || The Ballad of King Geraint; Untitled: ("This is the tale of a nameless fight")|| 1989 || The Ballad of King Geraint ||  || Tentative title ; Title provided by Lenore Preece ; Letter: Harold Preece, January 4, 1930  || Thom, Herman & Woods, § B
|-
| "This is the tale the Kaffirs tell ..." || 28 || This is the tale the Kaffirs tell as the tints of twilight melt || Fantasy Tales || 1983-12-21 Winter 1983 || Zulu Lord, The; Untitled ("This is the tale the Kaffirs tell ...") ||  || Tentative title ; British  || 
|-
| Thomas Fitzgerald, Shane O'Neill ...) || 24 || Thomas Fitzgerald, Shane O'Neill ||  ||  || Black Harps in the Hills Untitled: ("Thomas Fitzgerald, Shane O'Neill") || A shorter version of the 53-line "Black Harps in the Hills";  Letter: Harold Preece, c. March 1929, a version  || Thom, Herman & Woods, § B
|-
| Thor || 8 || I stand / Back of the North Wind || The Last of the Trunk Och Brev I Urval || 2007-03 Mar 2007 ||  ||  Wikisource || Letter: Tevis Clyde Smith; June 23, 1926) ; PD || 
|-
| Thor's Son || 24 || Serpent prow on the Afric coast || The Howard Collector #11 || 1969-03-21 Spring 1969 || The Rhyme of the Viking Path ||  || Letter: Tevis Clyde Smith; c. May 1930)  || 
|-
| "Thorfinn, Thorfinn, where have you been?" || 36 || Thorfinn, Thorfinn, where have you been? || Weirdbook #13 || 1978 || Return of the Sea-Farer, The; Untitled: ("Thorfinn, Thorfinn, where have you been?") ||  ||  || 
|-
| Thousand Years Ago, A || 21 || I was a chief of the Chatagai || Night Images || 1976 || Untitled ("I was a chief of the Chatagai") ||  || Tentative title  || 
|-
| "A thousand years ago great Genghis reigned" || 4 || A thousand years ago great Genghis reigned || A Rhyme of Salem Town and Other Poems || 2002 || Krakorum; Untitled ("A thousand years ago great Genghis reigned") ||  || Tentative title ; An early work ; An introduction by Howard states that he was 17 when he wrote this poem  || 
|-
| "A thousand years, perhaps, have come and gone" || 32 || A thousand years, perhaps, have come and gone || Up John Kane! and Other Poems || 1977 || When Death Drops Her Veil; Untitled ("A thousand years, perhaps, have come and gone") ||  || Tentative title  || 
|-
| Three Sketches || 88 || You stole niggers, John Brown || THE COLLECTED LETTERS OF ROBERT E. HOWARD, VOLUME 2: 1930–1932 || 2007 ||  || || Letter: Tevis Clyde Smith; ca. May 1932); A cycle of three poems: "John Brown" (24 lines), "Abe Lincoln" (34 lines), and "John Kelley" (30 lines) || 
|-
|  Through the mists of silence there came a sound  || 9 || Through the mists of silence there came a sound || Yesteryear #4 || 1989-10 Oct 1989 || Untitled: Through the mists of silence there came a sound ||  || Letter: Tevis Clyde Smith, c. February 1929  || 
|-
| Throw out that Red! || 4 || "'Throw out that Red!' they cried ..." || The Collected Letters Of Robert E. Howard, Volume 1: 1923–1929 || 2007 ||  || Untitled: ("'Throw out that Red!' they cried ...")  || ||Letter: Tevis Clyde Smith, c. March 1929 || 
|-
| Thus Spake Sven the Fool || 14 || The night is dark; the fenlands lie asleep || Singers in the Shadows || 1970 ||  ||  ||  || 
|-
| Tide, The || 30 || Thus in my mood I love you || Omniumgathum || October 1976 || To a Woman (3); Untitled ("Thus in my mood I love you") ||  || Pen name: Patrick Howard  Cited in the movie The Whole Wide World.There's an original REH typescript, titled "To a Woman", credited "Patrick Howard."  The title "The Tide" could be Glenn Lord's, to prevent confusion with previously published poems with the same title; SELECTED POEMS dropped the titles and just goes with the first line; the last two lines of "The Tide" are not included in the known versions of "To A Woman (3)." || 
|-
| Tides || 20 || I am weary of birth and battle || Contemporary Verse || 1929-09 Sep 1929 ||  ||  Wikisource || PD || 
|-
| Tiger Girl || 12 || Your eyes, as scintillant as jet || Omniumgathum || 1976 ||  ||  ||  || 
|-
| Time, the Victor || 8 || Swift with your mitts and fast on your feet || A Rhyme of Salem Town and Other Poems || 2002 || Untitled ("Swift with your mitts") ||  || Tentative title ; Unfinished  || 
|-
|  The times, the times stride on apace and fast || 14 || The times, the times stride on apace and fast || The New Howard Reader #5 || 1999-03 Mar 1999 || The Times, The Times Stride on Apace and Fast;  Untitled: The times, the times stride on apace and fast ||  || Written on the endpapers of a copy of Beau Geste  || 
|- style="background:#E0E0E0;"
| Timur-il-lang ||  ||  ||  ||  || Timur-lang ||  ||  || 
|-
| Timur-lang || 6 || The warm wind blows through the waving grain || The Howard Collector #5 || 1964-06-21 Summer 1964 || Timur-il-lang ||  || Letter: Harold Preece; undated) ; Shares lines with The Sign of the Sickle  || 
|-
| "Tingle, jingle, dingle, tingle ..." || 23 || Tingle, jungle, dingle, tingle, hear my brazen tones || A Rhyme of Salem Town and Other Poems || 2002 || Little Bell of Brass; Untitled ("Tingle, jingle, dingle, tingle ...") ||  || Tentative title  || 
|-
|  To a Blasé Lady  ||  ||  || n/a || n/a ||  ||  || Lost || Thom, Herman & Woods, § C
|-
| To a Certain Cultured Woman || 44 || Open the window; the jungle calls || The Last of the Trunk Och Brev I Urval || 2007-03 Mar 2007 || To Certain Cultured Women ||  Wikisource  || Letter: Tevis Clyde Smith; undated) ; PD || 
|-
| To a Friend || 14 || I toiled beside you in the galley's chains || Verses in Ebony || 1975 ||  ||  || Pen name: Patrick Howard  || 
|-
| To a Kind Missionary Woiker || 10 || Lissen, lady, youse can't do me nuttin' || A Rhyme of Salem Town and Other Poems || 2002 ||  ||  ||  || 
|-
| To a Modern Young Lady || 44 || Ages ago I came to woo ||  ||  || To a Woman ("Ages ago ...") (1) || || Similar to To a Woman, but not identical, with a different final quatrain || 
|-
| To a Nameless Woman || 28 || Hard shadows break along the smoky hills || Shadows of Dreams || 1989 ||  ||  || Letter: Tevis Clyde Smith; c. November 1928)  || 
|-
| To a Roman Woman || 28 || Gleaming ivory, black basalt || The Last of the Trunk Och Brev I Urval || 2007-03 Mar 2007 ||  ||  Wikisource || Letter: Tevis Clyde Smith; undated) ; PD || 
|-
| To a Woman (1) || 44 || Ages ago I came to woo || The Ghost Ocean and Other Poems of the Supernatural || 1982 || To a Modern Young Lady ||  Wikisource  || another typescript version that has a different last quatrain was included in the proposed poetry collection IMAGES OUT OF THE SKY by REH, TCS, and Lenore Preece, titled "To a Modern Young Lady" || 
|-
| To a Woman (2) || 12 || Through fathoms deep you sink me in the mould || Modern American Poetry || 1933 ||  ||  Wikisource || PD || 
|- style="background:#E0E0E0;"
| To a Woman (3) || 30 || Thus in my mood I love you ||  ||  || The Tide; Untitled ("Thus in my mood I love you") ||  || Very similar to THE TIDE—the last two lines of "Tide" have been truncated; some punctuational differences, one word changed, and third and fourth lines of each verse are combined in a single line || 
|-
| To All Evangelists ||  ||  || The Ghost Ocean and Other Poems of the Supernatural || 1982 || Flood, The ||  ||  || 
|-
| To All Lords of Commerce || 20 || Go down your little byway || Verses in Ebony || 1975 || To All the Lords of Commerce ||  ||  || 
|-
| To All Sophisticates || 48 || You who with pallid wine still toast || The Ghost Ocean and Other Poems of the Supernatural || 1982 ||  ||  || Pen name: Patrick Howard  || 
|-
|  To an Angry Woman  ||  ||  || n/a || n/a ||  ||  || Lost || Thom, Herman & Woods, § C
|-
| To an Earth-Bound Soul || 28 || Villon, Villon, your name is stone || The Grim Land and Others || 1976 || To an Earth Bound Soul ||  ||  || 
|-
| To Certain Cultured Women || 44 || Open the window; the jungle calls || The Last of the Trunk Och Brev I Urval || 2007-03 Mar 2007 || To a Certain Cultured Woman ||  Wikisource  || Letter: Tevis Clyde Smith; undated) ; PD || 
|-
| To Certain Orthodox Brethren || 18 || You say all things were made for you - then prove it, on your crowns || The Howard Collector #12 || 1970-03-21 Spring 1970 ||  ||  ||  || 
|-
| To Harry the Oliad Men || 12 || When the first winds of summer the roses brought || Omniumgathum || 1976 || Untitled ("When the first winds of summer ...") ||  || Tentative title  || 
|-
| To Lyle Saxon || 28 ||  || Shadows of Dreams || 1989 ||  ||  || Letter: Tevis Clyde Smith; undated)  || 
|-
| To Moderns || 47 || Little poets, little poets || A Rhyme of Salem Town and Other Poems || 2002 ||  ||  || Pen name: Patrick Mac Conaire Howard  || 
|-
|  To One Turned Faithless  ||  ||  || n/a || n/a ||  ||  || Lost || Thom, Herman & Woods, § C
|-
|  To One Who Understands  ||  ||  || n/a || n/a ||  ||  || Lost || Thom, Herman & Woods, § C
|-
| To the Contended || 20 || Bide by the fluted iron walls || The Collected Letters of Robert E. Howard, Volume 1: 1923-1929 || 2007-06 Jun 2007 ||  ||  Wikisource || Letter: Tevis Clyde Smith; c. April 1929) ; PD || 
|-
| To the Evangelists || 14 || Rise in your haughty pulpits; preach with a godly ire || The Junto || 1928-12 Dec 1928 || The Flood ||  ||  || 
|-
| To the Old Men || 20 || Age sat on his high throne || The Junto / The Howard Collector || 1928-09 Sep 1928 / Spring 1971 || Age (two slightly variant versions)||  || Conflict: , The Howard Collector, 1971/, The Junto, 1928 || Thom, Herman & Woods, § A
|-
| To the Stylists || 4 || Hammer your verses, file your songs || A Rhyme of Salem Town and Other Poems || 2002 ||  ||  ||  || 
|-
|  Toast to the British! Damn their souls to Hell  || 6 || Toast to the British! Damn their souls to Hell || The Last of the Trunk Och Brev I Urval || 2007-03 Mar 2007 || Untitled: Toast to the British! Damn their souls to Hell ||  Wikisource  || Letter: Tevis Clyde Smith, c. August–September 1927 ; PD || 
|-
| Today || 24 || I dreamed of a woman straight as a spear || The Grim Land and Others || 1976 ||  ||  || Pen name: Patrick Howard  || 
|-
| Tom Thumb Moider Mystery, The || 8 || Harry the Fourth was a godly king  || n/a || n/a ||  ||  || Letter: Tevis Clyde Smith; c. May 1932) ; Epigraph: The Tom Thumb Murder Mystery ; verse heading—never published separately  || 
|-
|  Tommy's Gone To Hilo || 16 || Tommy's gone and I'll go too!  || The Collected Letters of Robert E. Howard, Volume 1: 1923-1929 || 2007-06 Jun 2007 || || https://www.youtube.com/watch?v=fHyNvQJBjrQ; https://www.youtube.com/watch?v=3aSwYog4mY0 || Mnemonic reconstruction Letter: Robert W. Gordon, March 17, 1927; NOT INCLUDED IN COLLECTED POETRY ||
|-
|  The Tool Dresser  ||  ||  || n/a || n/a ||  ||  || Lost || Thom, Herman & Woods, § C
|-
| "Topaz seas and laughing skies" || 4 || Topaz seas and laughing skies || A Rhyme of Salem Town and Other Poems || 2002 || Sea-Chant; Untitled ("Topaz seas and laughing skies") ||  || Tentative title  || 
|-
| Toper || 4 || Toil, cares, annoyances all fade away || The Last of the Trunk Och Brev I Urval || 2007-03 Mar 2007 ||  ||  Wikisource || Letter: Tevis Clyde Smith; June 23, 1926) ; PD || 
|-
| Tower of Zukala, The || 48 || Far and behind the Eastern wind || A Rhyme of Salem Town and Other Poems || 2002 ||  ||  ||  || 
|-
| The towers stand recorders || 16(?) || The towers stand recorders || The Robert E. Howard Foundation Newsletter, vol. 1, #2 || 2007-11 Nov 2007 || Untitled: Builders, The (3) ||  ||  || 
|-
| Trail of Gold, The || 8 || Come with me to the Land of Sunrise || A Rhyme of Salem Town and Other Poems || 2002 || Untitled ("Come with me to the Land of Sunrise") ||  || Tentative title ; An early work  || 
|-
| Trail's End || 4 || Ho, for a trail that is bloody and long || A Rhyme of Salem Town and Other Poems || 2002 || Untitled ("Ho, for a trail that is bloody and long!") ||  || Tentative title ; Possibly incomplete ; From: Originally embodied as an untitled verse in an untitled story ("As he approached the two ...")  || 
|- 
| "Tread not where stony deserts hold" || 4 || Tread not where stony deserts hold || Dark Things || 1971 || Children of the Night, The The House in the Oaks ||  || Third of the three verses from "The House In The Oaks" (with "An Open Window" and "Arkham").  Originally from an early draft of "The Children of the Night", in which it was attributed to fictitious poet Justin Geoffrey.  Replaced in the final version with two lines from "The Gates of Damascus" by James Flecker, this poem was added by Derleth to his version of "The House in the Oaks"; titled with the first line in COLLECTED POETRY.   || Thom, Herman & Woods, § C
|-
| "The tribes of men rise up and pass" || 4 || The tribes of men rise up and pass || Weirdbook #13 || 1978 || Only a Shadow on the Grass; Untitled ("The tribes of men rise up and pass") ||  || Tentative title  || 
|-
| Tribute to the Sportsmanship of the Fans, A || 17 || Headlock, hammerlock, toss him on his bean again  || The Collected Letters of Robert E. Howard, Volume 2: 1930-1932 || 2007-10 Oct 2007 ||  ||  Wikisource || Letter: Tevis Clyde Smith; c. March 1930) ; PD || 
|-
| "'Turn out the light.' I raised a willing hand" || 14 || "Turn out the light." I raised a willing hand || Desire and Other Erotic Poems || 1989 || Desire; Untitled ("'Turn out the light.' I raised a willing hand") ||  || Tentative title  || 
|-
| "'Twas twice a hundred centuries ago" || 9 || Twas twice a hundred centuries ago || A Rhyme of Salem Town and Other Poems || 2002 || Now and Then; Untitled ("'Twas twice a hundred centuries ago") ||  || Tentative title ; Unfinished  || 
|-
| Twilight on Stonehenge || 14 || Great columns loom against the brooding sky  || Shadows of Dreams || 1989 ||  ||  || Letter: Tevis Clyde Smith; August 21, 1926)  || 
|-
| Twilight Striding O'er the Mountain  || 7 || Twilight striding o'er the mountain || The Right Hook, vol. 1, #3 || 1925-03-23 1925 || L'Envoi (3) ||  ||  || 
|-
| Twin Gates, The || 8 || The gates of Hades stand ajar || Singers in the Shadows || 1970 ||  ||  ||  || 
|-
| Two Men || 48 || Two men stood in the gates of day || The Ghost Ocean and Other Poems of the Supernatural || 1982 ||  ||  || Pen name: Patrick Howard  || 
|-
| "Under the grim San Saba hills" || 60 || Under the grim San Saba hills || A Rhyme of Salem Town and Other Poems || 2002 || The Lost Mine; Lost San Saba Mine, The; Untitled: ("Under the grim San Saba hills") ||  || Letter: H. P. Lovecraft, April 23, 1933  || 
|-
| Universe || 17 || My face may be a Universe peopled by billions and billions || Weird Tales #294 || 1989-09-21 Fall 1989 ||  ||  || Tentative title  || 
|-
| Untamed Avatars || 24 || They break from the pack and seek their own track || A Rhyme of Salem Town and Other Poems || 2002 || Untitled ("They break from the pack ...") ||  || Tentative title  || 
|-
| Untitled ("Across the wastes of No Man's Land")|| 28 || Across the wastes of No Man's Land, the grey-clad slayers came || A Rhyme of Salem Town and Other Poems || 2002 || No Man's Land ||  || Tentative title  || 
|-
| Untitled Actor, The || 12 || I am an actor and have been an actor from birth || A Rhyme of Salem Town and Other Poems || 2002 || Actor, The; Untitled (I am an actor ...") ||  || Tentative title  || Thom, Herman & Woods, § A
|-
| Untitled ("Adam's loins were mountains") || 40 || Adam's loins were mountains || The Collected Letters of Robert E. Howard, Volume 1: 1923-1929 || 2007-06 Jun 2007 ||  ||   Wikisource || Letter: Tevis Clyde Smith, c. November 1928 ; PD || 
|-
| Untitled ("Adventure, I have followed your beck")  || 21 || Adventure, I have followed your beck || Omniumgathum || 1976 || Adventure(1) ||  || Tentative title ; An early work  || Thom, Herman & Woods, § A
|-
| Untitled (Adventures)|| 8 || Scarlet and gold are the stars tonight || The Cross Plainsman  || August 2004 (last four lines only) / The Collected Letters of Robert E. Howard, Volume 1: 1923-1929 (first full appearance) || Adventures; Untitled: Scarlet and gold are the stars tonight ||  Wikisource  || Letter: Tevis Clyde Smith, ca. November 1928 ; PD|| Thom, Herman & Woods, § A
|-
| Untitled ("After the trumps are sounded") || 8 || After the trumps are sounded || The Last of the Trunk Och Brev I Urval || 2007-03 Mar 2007 ||  ||  Wikisource || Letter: Tevis Clyde Smith, c. September 1929 ; PD || 
|-
| Untitled ("Against the blood red moon a tower stands") || 8 lines, plus a prose introduction || Against the blood red moon a tower stands ||The Last of the Trunk Och Brev I Urval || 2007-03 Mar 2007 ||  ||  Wikisource || Letter: Tevis Clyde Smith, c. Aug/Sep 1927 ; PD || 
|-
| Untitled ("The ages stride on golden feet") || 6 || The ages stride on golden feet || A Rhyme of Salem Town and Other Poems || 2002 || Ages Stride on Golden Feet, The ||  || Tentative title  || Thom, Herman & Woods, § A
|-
| Untitled ("Ah, I know black queens whose passions blaze") || 34 || Ah, I know black queens whose passions blaze  || Risque Stories #1 || 1984-03 Mar 1984 || Strange Passion ||  || Tentative title  || 
|-
| Untitled ("Ah, the rover hides in Aves when he runs") || 4 || Ah, the rover hides in Aves when he runs || A Rhyme of Salem Town and Other Poems || 2002 || O the Brave Sea-Rover ||  || Tentative title ; An early work  || 
|-
| Untitled ("Ah, those were glittering, jeweled days") || 12 || Ah, those were glittering, jeweled days || Night Images || 1976 || Days of Glory ||  || Tentative title  || 
|-
| Untitled Alien || 16 || My brothers are blond and calm of speech || Verses in Ebony || 1975 || Alien; Untitled ("My brothers are blond and calm of speech") ||  ||  Tentative title ||   Thom, Herman & Woods, § A
|-
| Untitled: All Hallows Eve || 18 || Now anthropoid and leprous shadows lope || Amazing Stories || 1986-03 Mar 1986 ||  Untitled: ("Now anthropoid and leprous shadows lope") ||  || Tentative title  || Thom, Herman & Woods, § A
|-
| Untitled ("All is pose and artifice") || 4 || All is pose and artifice || A Rhyme of Salem Town and Other Poems || 2002 || Artifice ||  || Tentative title  || Thom, Herman & Woods, § A
|-
| Untitled ("All the crowd") || 20 || All the crowd || The Last of the Trunk Och Brev I Urval || 2007-03 Mar 2007 ||  ||  Wikisource || Letter: Tevis Clyde Smith, October 9, 1925 ; PD || 
|-
| Untitled ("Along the road that leads to Hell") || 28 || Along the road that leads to Hell || Singers in the Shadows || 1970 || Road to Hell, The ||  Wikisource || Lines 1-4 similar to lines 69-72 of The Dust Dance (version 1) ; PD || 
|-
| Untitled ("Am-ra stood on a mountain height") || 5 || Am-ra stood on a mountain height || Kull: Exile of Atlantis || 2006-10 Oct 2006 || Summer Morn ||   Wikisource || Tentative title ; PD || 
|-
| Untitled ("The ancient boast, the ancient song") || 12 || The ancient boast, the ancient song || A Rhyme of Salem Town and Other Poems || 2002 || The House of Gael ||  || Tentative title  || 
|-
| Untitled ("And Bill, he looked at me ...") ||  || And Bill, he looked at me ... || The Right Hook vol. 1, #2 || 1925-03-22 1925 ||  ||  ||  || 
|-
| Untitled ("And Dempsey climbed into the ring") || 6 || And Dempsey climbed into the ring and the crowd || The Collected Letters of Robert E. Howard, Volume 1: 1923-1929 || 2007-06 Jun 2007 || introduced with the line "In Carl S.'s style"  (presumably Sandberg) ||  Wikisource || Letter: Tevis Clyde Smith, July 16, 1925 ; PD|| 
|-
| Untitled ("And there were lethal women, flaming ice and fire") || 8 || And there were lethal women, flaming ice and fire || Yesteryear #4 || 1989-10 Oct 1989 ||  ||  || Letter: Tevis Clyde Smith, c. February 1929  || 
|-
| Untitled: Artifice || 4 || All is pose and artifice || A Rhyme of Salem Town and Other Poems || 2002 || Untitled: ("All is pose and artifice") ||  || Tentative title  || Thom, Herman & Woods, § A
|-
| Untitled ("As a great spider grows to monstrous girth") || 14 || As a great spider grows to monstrous girth || A Rhyme of Salem Town and Other Poems || 2002 || Ju-ju Doom ||  || Tentative title  || 
|-
| Untitled ("As I rode down to Lincoln town beneath a copper moon") || 4 || As I rode down to Lincoln town beneath a copper moon || A Rhyme of Salem Town and Other Poems || 2002 || As I Rode Down to Lincoln Town ||  || Tentative title  || Thom, Herman & Woods, § A
|-
| Untitled: As I Rode Down to Lincoln Town || 4 || As I rode down to Lincoln town beneath a copper moon || A Rhyme of Salem Town and Other Poems || 2002 ||   Untitled: ("As I rode down to Lincoln town beneath a copper moon") ||  || Tentative title  || Thom, Herman & Woods, § A
|-
| Untitled ("As I went down to Salem town, I met good Mistress Meek") || 74 || As I went down to Salem town, I met good Mistress Meek || A Rhyme of Salem Town and Other Poems || 2002 || A Rhyme of Salem Town ||  || Tentative title  || 
|-
| Untitled ("As you dance upon the air") || 7 || As you dance upon the air || A Rhyme of Salem Town and Other Poems || 2002 ||  ||  || Incomplete, only the final seven lines survive  || 
|-
| Untitled ("At the Inn of the Gory Dagger") || 56 || At the Inn of the Gory Dagger, with nothing to ... || The Last of the Trunk Och Brev I Urval || 2007-03 Mar 2007 ||  ||  Wikisource || Letter: Tevis Clyde Smith, c. February 1929 ; PD || 
|-
| Untitled ("Away in the dusty barracoon") || 88 || Away in the dusty barracoon || A Rhyme of Salem Town and Other Poems || 2002 || Cornish Jack ||  || Tentative title  || Thom, Herman & Woods, § C
|-
| Untitled Baal || 57 || My name is Baal; I walked the earth of yore || A Rhyme of Salem Town and Other Poems || 2002 ||   Untitled ("My name is Baal; I walked the earth of yore") ||  || Tentative title  || Thom, Herman & Woods, § B
|-
| Untitled: Baal-pteor || 6 || High on his throne Baal-pteor sat || A Rhyme of Salem Town and Other Poems || 2002 ||   Untitled: ("High on his throne Baal-pteor sat") ||  || Tentative title  || Thom, Herman & Woods, § B
|-
| Untitled: Babylon || 16 || For I have seen the lizards crawl || Always Comes Evening || 1957 ||  Untitled: ("For I have seen the lizards crawl") ||  "Babylon" || Originally untitled  || Thom, Herman & Woods, § B
|-
| Untitled: A Ballad of Beer || 28 || I was once, I declare, a grog-shop man || Shadows of Dreams || 1989 ||   Untitled: ("I was once, I declare, a grog-shop man") ||  || Letter: Tevis Clyde Smith, c. July 1930 ; Originally untitled  || Thom, Herman & Woods, § B
|-
| Untitled: "The Ballad of King Geraint" || 1,046 || This is the tale of a nameless fight || The Ballad of King Geraint || 1989 || Untitled: ("This is the tale of a nameless fight") ||  || Tentative title ; Title provided by Lenore Preece ; Letter: Harold Preece, January 4, 1930  || Thom, Herman & Woods, § B
|-
| Untitled: The Ballad of Singapore Nell—draft || 44 || There are grim things did || The Last of the Trunk Och Brev I Urval || 2007-03 Mar 2007 ||  Untitled: ("There are grim things did") ||  || Letter: Tevis Clyde Smith, undated ; From a draft of The Ballad of Singapore Nell  || 
|-
| Untitled: The Bandit || 31 || Out of the Texas desert, over the Rio Grande || A Rhyme of Salem Town and Other Poems || 2002 ||Untitled: ("Out of the Texas desert") ||  || Tentative title ; An early work  || Thom, Herman & Woods, § B
|-
| Untitled: The Baron and the Wench || 20 || The baron quaffed a draught of wine || A Rhyme of Salem Town and Other Poems || 2002 ||  Untitled: ("The baron quaffed a draught of wine") ||  || Tentative title ; Unfinished / || Thom, Herman & Woods, § B
|-
| Untitled: ("The Baron of Fenland ...") || 19 || The Baron of Fenland ... || American and European Manuscripts and Printed Books || 1986-12-19 19 December 1986 ||  ||  || Letter: Tevis Clyde Smith, c. September 1927 ; Also written on the endpapers of a copy of Beau Geste  || 
|-
| Untitled: ("The baron quaffed a draught of wine") || 20 || The baron quaffed a draught of wine || A Rhyme of Salem Town and Other Poems || 2002 || The Baron and the Wench ||  || Tentative title ; Unfinished / || Thom, Herman & Woods, § B
|-
| Untitled: ("A beggar, singing without") || 14 || A beggar, singing without || The Last of the Trunk Och Brev I Urval || 2007-03 Mar 2007 ||  ||  || Excerpted from the verse play "Bastards All."  Letter: Tevis Clyde Smith, c. March 1929  || 
|-
| Untitled: The Bell of Morni || 24 || There's a bell that hangs in a hidden cave || Bran Mak Morn — The Last King || 2001 ||  Untitled: ("There's a bell that hangs in a hidden cave") ||  || Tentative title  || Thom, Herman & Woods, § B
|-
| Untitled: ("Bill Boozy was a pirate bold") || 8 || Bill Boozy was a pirate bold || The Last of the Trunk Och Brev I Urval || 2007-03 Mar 2007 ||  ||   Wikisource|| Letter: Tevis Clyde Smith, c. July 30, 1923 ; PD || 
|-
| Untitled: Black Michael's Story || 22 || The moon above the Kerry hills ||  ||  || Retribution; The Song of Murtagh O'Brien; Untitled: ("The moon above the Kerry hills") ||  ||  || Thom, Herman & Woods, § B
|-
| Untitled: ("Brazen thewed giant of a grimmer Age") ||  || Brazen thewed giant of a grimmer Age || The Robert E. Howard Foundation Newsletter, vol. 1, #2 || 2007-11 Nov 2007 ||  ||  || Unfinished  || 
|-
| Untitled: ("The broken walls of Babel") || 10 || The broken walls of Babel rear || A Rhyme of Salem Town and Other Poems || 2002 || The Broken Walls of Babel ||  || Tentative title  || Thom, Herman & Woods, § B
|-
| Untitled: The Builders (3) || 16(?) || The towers stand recorders || The Robert E. Howard Foundation Newsletter, vol. 1, #2 || 2007-11 Nov 2007 ||  Untitled: ("The towers stand recorders") ||  ||  || 
|-
| Untitled: But the Hills Were Ancient Then || 24 || Now is a summer come out of the sea || Amra (vol. 2, no. 8) || 1959-11 Nov-December 1959 || Untitled: ("Now is a summer come out of the sea") ||  Wikisource || Originally untitled ; Title created by George Scithers ; PD || Thom, Herman & Woods, § B
|-
| Untitled: ("By old Abie Goldstein's pawn shop") || 8 || By old Abie Goldstein's pawn shop where the... || The Last of the Trunk Och Brev I Urval || 2007-03 Mar 2007 ||  ||  Wikisource || Letter: Tevis Clyde Smith, c. March 1929 ; Parody of "On the Road to Mandalay" by Rudyard Kipling.   PD || 
|-
| Untitled: A Calling to Rome|| 8 || There's a calling and a calling and a calling || A Rhyme of Salem Town and Other Poems || 2002 ||  Untitled ("There's a calling and a calling and a calling")||  || Tentative title  || Thom, Herman & Woods, § C
|-
| Untitled: The Call of Pan || 14 || My heart is a silver drum tonight || Shadows of Dreams || 1989 || Untitled: ("My heart is a silver drum tonight") ||  || Letter: Tevis Clyde Smith, c. November 1928  || The Call of PanThom, Herman & Woods, § C
|-
| Untitled: The Champ || 20 || The champion sneered, the crowds they jeered || Robert E. Howard Fight Magazine #1 || 1990-09 Sep 1990 || Untitled: ("The champion sneered") ||  || Tentative title  || Thom, Herman & Woods, § C
|-
| Untitled: ("The champion sneered") || 20 || The champion sneered, the crowds they jeered || Robert E. Howard Fight Magazine #1 || 1990-09 Sep 1990 || The Champ ||  || Tentative title  || Thom, Herman & Woods, § C
|-
| Untitled: Chant of the White Beard || 8 || O'er lakes agleam the old gods dream || Always Comes Evening || 1957 || Untitled: ("O'er lakes agleam the old gods dream") ||  || From: Men of the Shadows ; Originally untitled ; From: Men of the Shadows  || Thom, Herman & Woods, § C
|-
| Untitled: ("The chariots were chanting") || 14 || The chariots were chanting  || Shadows of Dreams || 1989 || The Last Words He Heard ||  || Letter: Tevis Clyde Smith, c. December 1928  || 
|-
| Untitled: ("Chesterton twanged on his lyre") || 5 || Chesterton twanged on his lyre || A Rhyme of Salem Town and Other Poems || 2002 || A Song of Bards ||  || Tentative title  || 
|-
| Untitled: The Chief of the Matabeles || 84 || The warm veldt spread beneath the tropic sun || A Rhyme of Salem Town and Other Poems || 2002 || Untitled: ("The warm veldt spread beneath the tropic sun") ||  || Tentative title ; Unfinished /; An early work  || Thom, Herman & Woods, § C
|- 
| Untitled: The Children of the Night || 4 || Tread not where stony deserts hold || Dark Things || 1971 || The House in the Oaks; Untitled: ("Tread not where stony deserts hold") ||  || Third of the three verses from "The House In The Oaks" (with "An Open Window" and "Arkham").  Originally from an early draft of "The Children of the Night", attributed to fictitious poet Justin Geoffrey.  Replaced in the final version with two lines from "The Gates of Damascus" by James Flecker, this poem was added by Derleth to his version of "The House in the Oaks"; titled with the first line in COLLECTED POETRY.   || Thom, Herman & Woods, § C
|-
| Untitled: ("A Chinese washer, Ching-Ling ...") ||  || A Chinese washer, Ching-Ling ... || The Toreador || 1925-07-05 5 July 1925 ||  ||  ||  || 
|-
| Untitled: ("Cities brooding beneath the seas") || 19 || Cities brooding beneath the seas || The Howard Collector #6 || 1965-03-21 Spring 1965 || Lines To Lovecraft; Who is Grandpa Theobold? ||  || Originally untitled ; Letter: Tevis Clyde Smith, c. November 1931  || 
|-
| Untitled: ("A clash of steel, a thud of hoofs") || 4 || A clash of steel, a thud of hoofs || The Last of the Trunk Och Brev I Urval || 2007-03 Mar 2007 ||  ||  Wikisource  || Letter: Tevis Clyde Smith, August 4, 1923 ; PD || 
|-
| Untitled: Code || 4 || We're a jolly good bunch of bums || A Rhyme of Salem Town and Other Poems || 2002 || Untitled: ("We're a jolly good bunch of bums") ||  || Tentative title ; An early work  || Thom, Herman & Woods, § C
|-
| Untitled: ("Come with me to the Land of Sunrise") || 8 || Come with me to the Land of Sunrise || A Rhyme of Salem Town and Other Poems || 2002 || The Trail of Gold ||  || Tentative title ; An early work  || 
|-
| Untitled: Cornish Jack || 88 || Away in the dusty barracoon || A Rhyme of Salem Town and Other Poems || 2002 || Untitled: ("Away in the dusty barracoon") ||  || Tentative title  || Thom, Herman & Woods, § C 
|-
| Untitled: Counterspells || 4 || The doine sidhe sang to our swords by night || Unaussprechlichen Kulten #1 || 1990-10 Oct 1990 ||  Untitled: ("The doine sidhe sang to our swords by night") ||  || Tentative title  || Thom, Herman & Woods, § C
|-
| Untitled: ("A cringing woman's lot is hard") || 44 || A cringing woman's lot is hard || The Last of the Trunk Och Brev I Urval || 2007-03 Mar 2007 ||  ||  Wikisource || Letter: Tevis Clyde Smith, c. June 1928 ; PD || 
|-
| Untitled: Dance Macabre || 16 || I saw the grass on the hillside bend || Weirdbook #12 || 1977 || Untitled: ("I saw the grass on the hillside bend") ||  || Tentative title  || 
|-
| Untitled: ("Dark are your eyes") || 10 || Dark are your eyes || The Last of the Trunk Och Brev I Urval || 2007-03 Mar 2007 ||  ||  Wikisource || Letter: Tevis Clyde Smith, January 30, 1925 ; PD || 
|-
| Untitled: Daughter of Evil || 44 || They cast her out of the court of the king || Chacal #2 || 1977-03-21 Spring 1977 || Untitled ("They cast her out of the court of the king") ||  || Letter: Tevis Clyde Smith, c. September 1930 ; Tentative title  || 
|-
| Untitled: A Dawn in Flanders || 8 || I can recall a quiet sky once more || The Howard Collector #5 || 1964-06-21 Summer 1964 ||  Untitled: ("I can recall a quiet sky") ||  ||  || 
|-
| Untitled: ("The day that towers, sapphire kissed") || 20 || The day that towers, sapphire kissed || Always Comes Evening || 1957 || Nisapur ||  "Nisapur" || Originally untitled  || 
|-
| Untitled: Days of Glory || 12 || Ah, those were glittering, jeweled days || Night Images || 1976 ||  Untitled: ("Ah, those were glittering, jeweled days") ||  || Tentative title  || 
|-
|  Untitled: ("Deep in my bosom ...") || 8 || Deep in my bosom ... || THE COLLECTED LETTERS OF ROBERT E. HOWARD, VOLUME 3: 1933–1936 ||  2008 || || || From a letter to Tevis Clyde Smith, undated ("Salaam: / I have forgotten ..."); did NOT get included in the first edition of COLLECTED POETRY||
|-
| Untitled: The Desert || 7 || Wide and free ranging || A Rhyme of Salem Town and Other Poems || 2002 || Untitled: ("Wide and free ranging") ||  || Tentative title ; An early work  || 
|-
| Untitled: Desire || 14 || "Turn out the light." I raised a willing hand || Desire and Other Erotic Poems || 1989 || Untitled: ("'Turn out the light.'") ||  || Tentative title  || 
|-
| Untitled: Devon Oak || 20 || I am a Devon oak || A Rhyme of Salem Town and Other Poems || 2002 || Untitled: ("I am a Devon oak") ||  || Tentative title  || 
|-
| Untitled: ("The doine sidhe sang to our swords by night") || 4 || The doine sidhe sang to our swords by night || Unaussprechlichen Kulten #1 || 1990-10 Oct 1990 || Counterspells ||  || Tentative title  || Thom, Herman & Woods, § C
|-
| Untitled:  Down the Ages || 22 || Forever down the ages || A Rhyme of Salem Town and Other Poems || 2002 ||Untitled: ("Forever down the ages") ||  || Tentative title ; Unfinished  || 
|-
| Untitled: ("Drawers that a girl strips down her thighs") || 4 || Drawers that a girl strips down her thighs || The Last of the Trunk Och Brev I Urval || 2007-03 Mar 2007 ||  ||  Wikisource || Letter: Tevis Clyde Smith, c. November 1928 ; PD || 
|-
| Untitled:  The Drum  || 14 || I heard the drum as I went down the street || A Rhyme of Salem Town and Other Poems || 2002 || Untitled: ("I heard the drum as I went down the street") ||  || Tentative title  || 
|-
| Untitled: The Drums of Pictdom || 4 || How can I wear the harness of toil || Bran Mak Morn || 1969-09 Sep 1969 || Untitled: ("How can I wear the harness of toil") ||  || Originally untitled  || 
|-
| Untitled: Dust Dance, The (2) || 72 || For I, with the shape of my kin, the ape || The Howard Collector #7 || 1965-12-21 Winter 1965 ||Untitled: ("For I, with the shape of my kin, the ape") ||  || Incomplete ; Shares lines with version (1), The Song of Horsa's Galley and The Road to Hell ; Letter: Tevis Clyde Smith, c. March 1928, partial  || 
|-
| Untitled: ("Early in the morning I gazed at the eastern skies") || 4 || Early in the morning I gazed at the eastern skies || The Last of the Trunk Och Brev I Urval || 2007-03 Mar 2007 ||  ||  Wikisource || PD || 
|-
| Untitled: ("Early in the mornin' in the month of May") || 16 || Early in the mornin' in the month of May ||  ||  ||  || || From the story BOOT HILL PAYOFF (embedded within the text); did NOT get included in the first edition of COLLECTED POETRY|| 
|-
| Untitled: ("The east is red and I am dead") || 2 || The east is red and I am dead || The Collected Letters of Robert E. Howard, Volume 1: 1923-1929 || 2007-06 Jun 2007 ||  ||  Wikisource || Letter: Tevis Clyde Smith, c. January 1928 ; PD || 
|-
| Untitled: Ecstasy || 60 || There is a strangeness in my soul || Rhymes of Death || 1975 || Untitled: ("There is a strangeness in my soul") ||  || Tentative title  || 
|-
| Untitled: The Ecstasy of Desolation || 22 || Long were the years, lifelong and deathly-bare || Shadows of Dreams || 1989 || Untitled: ("Long were the years, lifelong and deathly-bare") ||  || Letter: Tevis Clyde Smith, c. October 1928  || 
|-
| Untitled: Edgar Guest || 5 || How long have you written, Eddie Guest? How long have you twirled a pen || A Rhyme of Salem Town and Other Poems || 2002 || Untitled: ("How long have you written, Eddie Guest?") ||  || Tentative title ; Unfinished / || 
|-
| Untitled: ("The elder gods have fled") || 4 || The elder gods have fled || A Rhyme of Salem Town and Other Poems || 2002 || Passing of the Elder Gods ||  || Tentative title  || 
|-
| Untitled: ("Eons before Atlantean days") || 24 || Eons before Atlantean days in the time of the world's black dawn || Ariel || 1976-09-21 Autumn 1976 || The Symbol ||  || Tentative title  || 
|-
| Untitled: "Exhortation" || 4 || Oh, ye who tread the narrow way || A Rhyme of Salem Town and Other Poems || 2002 ||   Untitled: ("Oh, ye who tread the narrow way") ||  || Tentative title ; An early work  || 
|-
| Untitled: "A Fable for Critics" || 98 || Now come the days of high endeavor and / The blare of brazen trumpets through the land.  || Shadows of Dreams || 1989 ||   Untitled: ("Now come the days of high endeavor") || || || Letter: Tevis Clyde Smith, ca. November–December 1928 || 
|-
| Untitled: ("Far in the gloomy Northland") || 24 || Far in the gloomy Northland || A Rhyme of Salem Town and Other Poems || 2002 || Far in the Gloomy Northland ||  || Tentative title ; An early work  || 
|-
| Untitled: "Farewell, Proud Munster" || 28 || Night in the county of Donegal || A Rhyme of Salem Town and Other Poems || 2002 ||   Untitled: ("Night in the county of Donegal") ||  || Tentative title ; An early work  || 
|-
| Untitled: "The Feud" || 12 || He did not glance above the trail to the laurel where I lay || Fantasy Crossroads #13 || 1978-06 Jun 1978 ||   Untitled: ("He did not glance above the trail") ||  || Tentative title  || 
|-
| Untitled: ("Fill up my goblet") || 15 || Fill up my goblet || The Robert E. Howard Foundation Newsletter, vol. 1, #2 || 2007-11 Nov 2007 || Last 8 lines used as verse heading in the short story "The Sowers of the Thunder" as "The Ballad of Baibars" ||  ||  || 
|-
| Untitled: ("The first came up / Was a little cabin boy ...") || 5 7-line verses and a 6-line chorus repeated after each one || The first came up / Was a little cabin boy || The Collected Letters of Robert E. Howard, Volume 1: 1923-1929 || 2007-06 Jun 2007 || The Mermaid; Oh, The Stormy Winds; || https://www.youtube.com/watch?v=BcAPJ77WfCs || Mnemonic reconstruction of an old folk song Letter: Robert W. Gordon, February 4, 1925; NOT INCLUDED IN COLLECTED POETRY ||
|-
| Untitled: ("The first great man that ever I robbed ...") || 16 || The first great man that ever I robbed || The Collected Letters of Robert E. Howard, Volume 1: 1923-1929 || 2007-06 Jun 2007 || The Highwaymen || http://mudcat.org/thread.cfm?threadid=29243); https://www.youtube.com/watch?v=MD4Nd_rzNWg || Mnemonic reconstruction of "Allan Tyne of Harrow" a.k.a. "Valentine of Harrow" Letter: Robert W. Gordon, misdated January 2, 1926—actually 1927; NOT INCLUDED IN COLLECTED POETRY ||
|-
| Untitled: "Flaming Marble" || 14 || I carved a woman out of marble when || Poet's Scroll || 1929-01 Jan 1929 || Untitled: ("I carved a woman out of marble") ||  Wikisource || PD; Pen name: Patrick Howard  || 
|-
| Untitled: ("Flappers flicker and flap and flirt") || 12 || Flappers flicker and flap and flirt || The Last of the Trunk Och Brev I Urval || 2007-03 Mar 2007 ||  ||   Wikisource  || Letter: Tevis Clyde Smith, c. December 1928 ; PD || 
|-
| Untitled: "Flight" || 24 || A jackal laughed from a thicket still, the stars were haggard pale || Witchcraft & Sorcery || 1971-05 May 1971 ||  Untitled: ("A jackal laughed from a thicket still") ||  || Letter: Tevis Clyde Smith, c. September 1927, earlier, shorter version  || 
|-
| Untitled: ("For I have seen the lizards crawl") || 16 || For I have seen the lizards crawl || Always Comes Evening || 1957 || Babylon ||  "Babylon" || Originally untitled  || Thom, Herman & Woods, § B
|-
| Untitled: ("For I, with the shape of my kin, the ape") || 72 || For I, with the shape of my kin, the ape || The Howard Collector #7 || 1965-12-21 Winter 1965 || Dust Dance, The (2) ||  || Incomplete ; Shares lines with version (1), The Song of Horsa's Galley and The Road to Hell ; Letter: Tevis Clyde Smith, c. March 1928, partial  || 
|-
| Untitled: ("For what is a maid to the shout of kings") || 14 || For what is a maid to the shout of kings || A Rhyme of Salem Town and Other Poems || 2002 ||  ||  || Incomplete, only the final fourteen lines survive  || 
|-
| Untitled: ("Forever down the ages") || 22 || Forever down the ages || A Rhyme of Salem Town and Other Poems || 2002 || Down the Ages ||  || Tentative title ; Unfinished  || 
|-
| Untitled: ("Forth from the purple") || 12 || Forth from the purple and feats of the palace || The Grim Land and Others || 1976 || The Outcast ||  || Tentative title  || 
|-
| Untitled: "Freedom" || 8 || The world is rife, say I || A Rhyme of Salem Town and Other Poems || 2002 ||   Untitled: ("The world is rife, say I") ||  || Tentative title  || 
|-
| Untitled: ("From the dim red dawn of Creation") || 34 || From the dim red dawn of Creation || Always Comes Evening || 1957 || Men of the Shadows (verse heading)||  "Men of the Shadows" || From: Men of the Shadows ; Originally untitled  || 
|-
| Untitled: "The Ghost Ocean" || 16 || There is a sea and a silent moon || The Ghost Ocean and Other Poems of the Supernatural || 1982 || Untitled: ("There is a sea and a silent moon") ||  || Tentative title  || 
|-
| Untitled: ("Give ye of my best though the dole be meager") || 8 || Give ye of my best though the dole be meager || The Last of the Trunk Och Brev I Urval || 2007-03 Mar 2007 ||  ||   Wikisource  || Letter: Tevis Clyde Smith, June 23, 1926 ; PD || 
|-
| Untitled: "The Gods of Easter Island" || 14 || Long ere Priapus pranced through groves Arcadian sunlight kissed || Always Comes Evening || 1957 ||   Untitled: ("Long ere Priapus pranced through groves") ||  "The Gods of Easter Island" || Originally untitled  || 
|-
| Untitled: ("Gods of heather, gods of lake") || 34 || Gods of heather, gods of lake || Always Comes Evening || 1957 || Rune; Rune of the Ancient One ||  "Rune" || From: Men of the Shadows ; Originally untitled ; Separate version called Rune of the Ancient One  || 
|-
| Untitled: ("The great grey oaks by the banks of the river") || 5 || The great grey oaks by the banks of the river || A Rhyme of Salem Town and Other Poems || 2002 || The Oaks ||  || Tentative title  || 
|-
| Untitled: "The Guise of Youth" || 20 || Men say my years are few; yet I am old || Science-Fantasy Correspondent #1 || 1975-12 Dec 1975 ||   Untitled: ("Men say my years are few; yet I am old") ||  || Tentative title  || 
|-
| Untitled: ("Hark, hark, the jackals bark") || 41 || Hark, hark, the jackals bark || Fantasy Crossroads #7 || 1976-02 Feb 1976 || Madame Goose's Rhymes ||  || Tentative title  || 
|-
| Untitled: "Harvest" || 4 || We reap and bind the bitter yield || The Howard Collector || 1972-09-21 Autumn 1972 ||   Untitled: ("We reap and bind the bitter yield") ||  || Originally untitled  || 
|-
| Untitled: ("A haunting cadence fills the night") || 58 || A haunting cadence fills the night with fierce longing ... || Yesteryear #4 || 1989-10 Oct 1989 ||  ||  ||  || 
|-
| Untitled: ("He clutched his penis tight") || 4 || He clutched his penis tight || The Collected Letters of Robert E. Howard, Volume 1: 1923-1929 || 2007-06 Jun 2007 ||  ||   Wikisource  || Letter: Tevis Clyde Smith, c. November 1928 ; PD || 
|-
| Untitled: ("He did not glance above the trail") || 12 || He did not glance above the trail to the laurel where I lay || Fantasy Crossroads #13 || 1978-06 Jun 1978 || The Feud ||  || Tentative title  || 
|-
| Untitled: ("He has rigged her and tricked her") || 5 || He has rigged her and tricked her || A Rhyme of Salem Town and Other Poems || 2002 || The Stralsund ||  || Tentative title  || 
|-
| Untitled: ("The helmsman gaily, rode down the rickerboo") || 7 || The helmsman gaily, rode down the rickerboo || The Last of the Trunk Och Brev I Urval || 2007-03 Mar 2007 ||  ||  Wikisource   || Letter: Tevis Clyde Smith, June 22, 1923 ; PD || 
|-
| Untitled: ("Here where the post oaks crown the ridge") || 39 || Here where the post oaks crown the ridge, and the dreary sand-drifts lie || A Robert E. Howard Memorial: June 13–15, 1986 || 1986 || The Sand-Hills' Crest ||  || Tentative title  || 
|-
| Untitled: ("H'Id like to see Cheapside go up in flames") || 4 || H'Id like to see Cheapside go up in flames || The Collected Letters of Robert E. Howard, Volume 1: 1923-1929 || 2007-06 Jun 2007 || Untitled: ("H'Id like to see Cheapside go up in flames") ||  ||  Letter: Tevis Clyde Smith, contained in the untitled story "Hatrack!"; NOT INCLUDED IN COLLECTED POETRY || 
|-
| Untitled: ("A high land and a hill land!") ||  || A high land and a hill land!  || Unpublished || n/a  || Untitled: ("A high land and a hill land!") ||   ||  || handwritten, discovered among the Tevis Clyde Smith papers at Texas A & M University  || Thom, Herman & Woods   
|-
| Untitled: ("High on his throne Baal-pteor sat") || 6 || High on his throne Baal-pteor sat || A Rhyme of Salem Town and Other Poems || 2002 || Baal-pteor ||  || Tentative title  || Thom, Herman & Woods, § B
|-
| Untitled: ("High on this throne sat Bran Mak Morn") || 72 || High on this throne sat Bran Mak Morn || Bran Mak Morn || 1969-09 Sep 1969 || A Song of the Race ||  || Originally untitled ; A Bran Mak Morn poem || 
|-
| Untitled: ("High the towers and mighty the walls") || 43 || High the towers and mighty the walls, oh, proud-crested sons of Babylon || A Rhyme of Salem Town and Other Poems || 2002 || Who Shall Sing of Babylon? ||  || Tentative title  || 
|-
| Untitled: ("Hills of the North! Lavender hills") || 7 || Hills of the North! Lavender hills || The Last of the Trunk Och Brev I Urval || 2007-03 Mar 2007 ||  ||  Wikisource || Letter: Tevis Clyde Smith, January 30, 1925 ; PD || 
|-
| Untitled: ("Ho, for a trail that is bloody and long!") || 4 || Ho, for a trail that is bloody and long || A Rhyme of Salem Town and Other Poems || 2002 || Trail's End ||  || Tentative title ; Possibly incomplete ; From: Untitled, begins "As he approached..."  || 
|-
| Untitled: ("Ho, ho, the long lights lift amain") || Putatively, 16 lines-—In the original letter, the entire poem is written out like a paragraph of prose || Ho, ho, the long lights lift amain || The Last of the Trunk Och Brev I Urval || 2007-03 Mar 2007 ||  ||  || Letter: Tevis Clyde Smith, c. June 1928  || 
|-
| Untitled: ("Ho merry bark ...") ||  || Ho merry bark ... || The Right Hook vol. 1, #2 || 1925-03-22 1925 ||  ||  ||  || 
|- 
| Untitled: The House in the Oaks || 4 || Tread not where stony deserts hold || Dark Things || 1971 || The Children of the Night; Untitled: ("Tread not where stony deserts hold") ||  || Third of the three verses from "The House In The Oaks" (with "An Open Window" and "Arkham").  Originally from an early draft of "The Children of the Night", attributed to fictitious poet Justin Geoffrey.  Replaced in the final version with two lines from "The Gates of Damascus" by James Flecker, this poem was added by Derleth to his version of "The House in the Oaks"; titled with the first line in COLLECTED POETRY.   || Thom, Herman & Woods, § C
|-
| Untitled: ("The House of Asgard passes with the night") || 8 || The House of Asgard passes with the night || The Howard Collector #14 || 1971-03-21 Spring 1971 || No More the Serpent Prow ||  || Originally untitled  || 
|-
| Untitled: The House of Gael || 12 || The ancient boast, the ancient song || A Rhyme of Salem Town and Other Poems || 2002 ||   Untitled: ("The ancient boast, the ancient song") ||  || Tentative title  || 
|-
| Untitled: ("How can I wear the harness of toil") || 4 || How can I wear the harness of toil || Bran Mak Morn || 1969-09 Sep 1969 || The Drums of Pictdom ||  || Originally untitled  || 
|-
| Untitled: ("How long have you written, Eddie Guest?") || 5 || How long have you written, Eddie Guest? How long have you twirled a pen || A Rhyme of Salem Town and Other Poems || 2002 || Edgar Guest ||  || Tentative title ; Unfinished / || 
|-
| Untitled: ("A hundred years the great war raged") || 4 || A hundred years the great war raged || The Last of the Trunk Och Brev I Urval || 2007-03 Mar 2007 ||  ||  Wikisource || Letter: Tevis Clyde Smith, August 4, 1923 ; PD || 
|-
| Untitled: ("I am a Devon oak")  || 20 || I am a Devon oak || A Rhyme of Salem Town and Other Poems || 2002 || Devon Oak ||  || Tentative title  || 
|-
| Untitled: ("I am an actor and have been an actor from birth") || 12 || I am an actor and have been an actor from birth || A Rhyme of Salem Town and Other Poems || 2002 || The Actor ||  || Tentative title  || Thom, Herman & Woods, § A
|-
| Untitled: ("I am MAN from the primal, I") || 7 || I am MAN from the primal, I || The Last of the Trunk Och Brev I Urval || 2007-03 Mar 2007 ||  ||   Wikisource || Letter: Tevis Clyde Smith, c. March 1928 ; PD || 
|-
| Untitled: ("I am the Spirit of War!") || 9 || I am the Spirit of War! || The Last of the Trunk Och Brev I Urval || 2007-03 Mar 2007 ||  ||  Wikisource || Letter: Tevis Clyde Smith, January 30, 1925 ; PD || 
|-
| Untitled: ("I Call the Muster of Iron Men") ||  || I call the muster of iron men || Argosy All-Story Weekly || July 20, 1929 || Untitled: ("I call the muster of iron men") || || From an early draft of the short story "Crowd-Horror"; titled with the first line in COLLECTED POETRY ||
|-
| Untitled: ("I can recall a quiet sky") || 8 || I can recall a quiet sky once more || The Howard Collector #5 || 1964-06-21 Summer 1964 || A Dawn in Flanders ||  ||  || 
|-
| Untitled: ("I carved a woman out of marble") || 14 || I carved a woman out of marble when || Poet's Scroll || 1929-01 Jan 1929 || Flaming Marble ||  Wikisource || PD; Pen name: Patrick Howard  || 
|-
| Untitled: ("I caught Joan alone upon her bed") || 4 || I caught Joan alone upon her bed || A Rhyme of Salem Town and Other Poems || 2002 || Prelude ||  || Tentative title  || 
|-
| Untitled: ("I cut my teeth on toil and pain") || 12 || I cut my teeth on toil and pain || The Ghost Ocean and Other Poems of the Supernatural || 1982 || When the Glaciers Rumbled South ||  || Tentative title  || 
|-
| Untitled: ("I do not sing of a paradise") || 4 || I do not sing of a paradise || The Collected Letters of Robert E. Howard, Volume 1: 1923-1929 || 2007-06 Jun 2007 ||  ||  Wikisource  || Letter: Tevis Clyde Smith, c. January 1928 ; PD || 
|-
| Untitled: ("I hate the man who tells me that I lied") || 24 || I hate the man who tells me that I lied || The Collected Letters of Robert E. Howard, Volume 1: 1923-1929 || 2007-06 Jun 2007 ||  ||  Wikisource || Letter: Tevis Clyde Smith, c. November 1928 ; PD || 
|-
| Untitled: ("I heard the drum as I went down the street") || 14 || I heard the drum as I went down the street || A Rhyme of Salem Town and Other Poems || 2002 || The Drum ||  || Tentative title  || 
|-
| Untitled: ("I hold all women are a gang of tramps") || 10 || I hold all women are a gang of tramps || The Last of the Trunk Och Brev I Urval || 2007-03 Mar 2007 ||  ||  Wikisource || PD || 
|-
| Untitled: ("I knocked upon her lattice — soft!") || 8 || I knocked upon her lattice — soft! || Lewd Tales || 1987 ||  ||  || Letter: Tevis Clyde Smith, c. March 1929 ; From: Songs of Bastards, Act 1, Scene 1 || 
|-
| Untitled: ("I lay in Yen's opium joint") || 7 || I lay in Yen's opium joint || The Last of the Trunk Och Brev I Urval || 2007-03 Mar 2007 ||  ||   Wikisource || Letter: Tevis Clyde Smith, January 30, 1925 ; PD || 
|-
| Untitled: ("I'm more than a man ...") ||  || I'm more than a man ... || n/a || n/a ||  ||  || From the draft of the story Yellow Laughter ; Never published  || 
|-
| Untitled: ("I saw the grass on the hillside bend") || 16 || I saw the grass on the hillside bend || Weirdbook #12 || 1977 || Dance Macabre ||  || Tentative title  || 
|-
| Untitled: ("I stand in the streets of the city") || 8 || I stand in the streets of the city || Night Images || 1976 || The King of the Ages Comes ||  || Tentative title  || 
|-
| Untitled: ("I tell you this my friend ...") || 9 || I tell you this my friend ... || The Last of the Trunk Och Brev I Urval || 2007-03 Mar 2007 ||  Wikisource  ||  || Letter: Tevis Clyde Smith, August 6, 1925 ; PD || 
|-
| Untitled: ("I too have strode those white-paved roads") || 4 || I too have strode those white-paved roads that run || The Howard Collector #17 || 1972-09-21 Autumn 1972 || Roads ||  || Originally untitled  || 
|-
| Untitled: ("I was a chief of the Chatagai") || 21 || I was a chief of the Chatagai || Night Images || 1976 || A Thousand Years Ago ||  || Tentative title  || 
|-
| Untitled: ("I was a prince of China") || 18 || I was a prince of China, lord of a million spears || Always Comes Evening || 1957 || Prince and Beggar ||  || Originally untitled  || 
|-
| Untitled: ("I, was I there") || 10 || I, was I there || A Rhyme of Salem Town and Other Poems || 2002 || Was I There? ||  || Tentative title  || 
|-
| Untitled: ("I was once, I declare, a grog-shop man") || 28 || I was once, I declare, a grog-shop man || Shadows of Dreams || 1989 || A Ballad of Beer ||  || Letter: Tevis Clyde Smith, c. July 1930 ; Originally untitled  || Thom, Herman & Woods, § B
|-
| Untitled: ("If life was a thing that money could buy") || 2 || If life was a thing that money could buy || The Collected Letters of Robert E. Howard, Volume 1: 1923-1929 || 2007-06 Jun 2007 || ||  ||  Letter: Tevis Clyde Smith, ca. October 1927; contained in the story "The Fastidious Fooey Mancucu"; parody of an old saying whose second line is usually some variant of "The rich would live and the poor would die"  ||  
|-
| Untitled: ("I'm more than a man ...") ||  || I'm more than a man ... || n/a || n/a ||  ||  || From the draft of the story Yellow Laughter ; Never published  || 
|-
| Untitled: "In the Ring" || 47 || Over the place the lights go out || Robert E. Howard's Fight Magazine #4 || 1996-10 Oct 1996 || Untitled: ("Over the place the lights go out") ||  || Tentative title  || 
|-
| Untitled: "Invective" || 4 || There burns in me no honeyed drop of love || Always Comes Evening || 1957 ||   Untitled: ("There burns in me no honeyed drop of love") ||  "Invective" ||  || 
|-
| Untitled: ("The iron harp that Adam christened Life") || 18 || The iron harp that Adam christened Life || The Collected Letters of Robert E. Howard, Volume 1: 1923-1929 || 2007-06 Jun 2007 ||  ||  Wikisource  || Letter: Tevis Clyde Smith, c. April 1929 ; PD || 
|-
| Untitled: ("It wuz on a starry night, in the month of July") || 4 || It wuz on a starry night, in the month of July ...) || The Howard Collector #6 || 1965 || LAMENT FOR JESSE JAMES; Title is Howard's only to the extent that it is referred to thus in the text.  || || A barroom song taken from the Sonora Kid story "Knife, Bullet and Noose"(a.k.a. "Knife, Gun and Noose"); variation on a very common theme, probably with adjustments by Howard.  Probably never published separately.]
|-
| Untitled: ("A jackal laughed from a thicket still") || 24 || A jackal laughed from a thicket still, the stars were haggard pale || Witchcraft & Sorcery || 1971-05 May 1971 || Flight ||  || Letter: Tevis Clyde Smith, c. September 1927, earlier, shorter version  || 
|-
| Untitled: Ju-ju Doom || 14 || As a great spider grows to monstrous girth || A Rhyme of Salem Town and Other Poems || 2002 ||   Untitled: ("As a great spider grows to monstrous girth") ||  || Tentative title  || 
|-
| Untitled: ("Keep women, thrones and kingly lands") || 4 || Keep women, thrones and kingly lands || The Collected Letters of Robert E. Howard, Volume 1: 1923-1929 || 2007-06 Jun 2007 ||  ||  Wikisource  || Letter: Tevis Clyde Smith, c. January 1928 ; PD || 
|-
| Untitled: ("Keresa, Keresita") || 24 || Keresa, Keresita || Shadows of Dreams || 1989 || Keresa, Keresita ||  || Letter: Tevis Clyde Smith, c. March 1928  || 
|-
| Untitled: "The King of the Ages Comes" || 8 || I stand in the streets of the city || Night Images || 1976 || Untitled: ("I stand in the streets of the city") ||  || Tentative title  || 
|-
| Untitled: "Krakorum" || 4 || A thousand years ago great Genghis reigned || A Rhyme of Salem Town and Other Poems || 2002 ||   Untitled: ("A thousand years ago great Genghis reigned") ||  || Tentative title ; An early work ; An introduction by Howard states that he was 17 when he wrote this poem  || 
|-
| Untitled: "The Ladder of Life" || 4 || Life is a ladder of cynical years || A Rhyme of Salem Town and Other Poems || 2002 ||   Untitled: ("Life is a ladder of cynical years") ||  || Tentative title  || 
|-
| Untitled: "Land of the Pioneer" || 8 || The wild bees hum in the tangled vines || A Rhyme of Salem Town and Other Poems || 2002 ||   Untitled: ("The wild bees hum") ||  || Tentative title ; An early work  || 
|-
| Untitled: "The Last Words He Heard" || 14 || The chariots were chanting  || Shadows of Dreams || 1989 || Untitled: ("The chariots were chanting") ||  || Letter: Tevis Clyde Smith, c. December 1928  || 
|-
| Untitled: "Legacy of Tubal-Cain, The" || 10 || "No more!" they swear; I laugh to hear them speak || The Howard Collector #18 || 1973-09-21 Autumn 1973 ||  Untitled ("'No more!' they swear ...") ||  || Originally untitled  || 
|-
| Untitled: ("Let it rest with the ages mysteries") || 4 || Let it rest with the ages mysteries || The Collected Letters of Robert E. Howard, Volume 2: 1930-1932 || 2007-10 Oct 2007 || Lines To Lovecraft; Who Is Grandpa Theobald? (verse heading)||   || Letter: Tevis Clyde Smith, c. November 1931 ;Not actually written by Howard, but a quote from WHERE CANNIKANS CLINKED by Charles Nichols Webb, which, to confuse matters, Robert Louis Stevenson also cited in a poem || 
|-
| Untitled: ("Let me dream by a silver stream") || 4 || Let me dream by a silver stream ||The Collected Letters of Robert E. Howard, Volume 3: 1933-1936 || 2008 ||Untitled: ("Let me dream by a silver stream") ||  || Letter: Tevis Clyde Smith, undated; did NOT get included in the first edition of COLLECTED POETRY  ||  
|-
| Untitled: ("Let me live as I was born to live") || 4 || Let me live as I was born to live || The Collected Letters of Robert E. Howard, Volume 1: 1923-1929 || 2007-06 Jun 2007 ||  ||  Wikisource || Letter: Tevis Clyde Smith, c. November 1928   ; PD || 
|-
| Untitled: ("Let us up in the hills ...") ||  || Let us up in the hills ... || Lewd Tales || 1987 ||  ||  || Letter: Tevis Clyde Smith, c. March 1929 ; From: Songs of Bastards, Act 1, Scene 2 || 
|-
| Untitled: ("Life is a cynical, romantic pig") || 5 || Life is a cynical, romantic pig || The Collected Letters of Robert E. Howard, Volume 2: 1930-1932 || 2007-10 Oct 2007 ||  ||  Wikisource || Letter: Tevis Clyde Smith, c. February 1930 ; PD || 
|-
| Untitled: ("Life is a ladder of cynical years") || 4 || Life is a ladder of cynical years || A Rhyme of Salem Town and Other Poems || 2002 || The Ladder of Life ||  || Tentative title  || 
|-
| Untitled: ("Life is a lot of hooey") || 4 || Life is a lot of hooey || Lewd Tales || 1987 ||  ||  || Letter: Tevis Clyde Smith, c. March 1929 ; From: Songs of Bastards, Act 2, Scene 1 || 
|-
| Untitled: ("Life is the same, yet of many phases") || 5 || Life is the same, yet of many phases || Unaussprechlichen Kulten #2 || 1992-07 Jul 1992 || The Phases of Life ||  || Tentative title ; French  || 
|-
| Untitled "Limericks to Spank By" || 15 || There was a young girl from Siberia || Desire and Other Erotic Poems || 1989 || Untitled ("There was a young girl from Siberia") ||  || Tentative title ; Three 5-line limericks  || 
|-
| Untitled: "Lines to Lovecraft" || 19 || Cities brooding beneath the seas || The Howard Collector #6 || 1965-03-21 Spring 1965 || Untitled: ("Cities brooding beneath the seas"); Who is Grandpa Theobold?||  || Originally untitled ; Letter: Tevis Clyde Smith, c. November 1931  || 
|-
| Untitled: "Little Bell of Brass" || 23 || Tingle, jingle, dingle, tingle, hear my brazen tones || A Rhyme of Salem Town and Other Poems || 2002 || Untitled: ("Tingle, jingle, dingle, tingle") ||  || Tentative title  || 
|-
| Untitled: ("Little brown man of Nippon who apes the ways of the West") || 36 || Little brown man of Nippon who apes the ways of the West || A Rhyme of Salem Town and Other Poems || 2002 || Little Brown Man of Nippon ||  || Tentative title ; Letter: Tevis Clyde Smith, c. April 1932  || 
|-
| Untitled: ("Lizzen my children and you shall be told") || 6 || Lizzen my children and you shall be told || Robert E. Howard: Selected Letters: 1923-1930 || 1989-10 Oct 1989 ||  ||  || Letter: Tevis Clyde Smith, c. September 1931  || 
|-
| Untitled: ("Long ere Priapus pranced through groves") || 14 || Long ere Priapus pranced through groves Arcadian sunlight kissed || Always Comes Evening || 1957 || The Gods of Easter Island ||  "The Gods of Easter Island" || Originally untitled  || 
|-
| Untitled: ("Long were the years, lifelong and deathly-bare") || 22 || Long were the years, lifelong and deathly-bare || Shadows of Dreams || 1989 || The Ecstasy of Desolation ||  || Letter: Tevis Clyde Smith, c. October 1928  || 
|-
| Untitled: "The Lost Mine" || 60 || Under the grim San Saba hills || A Rhyme of Salem Town and Other Poems || 2002 ||  The Lost San Saba Mine; Untitled: ("Under the grim San Saba hills") ||  || Letter: H. P. Lovecraft, April 23, 1933  || 
|-
| Untitled: "The Lost San Saba Mine" || 60 || Under the grim San Saba hills || A Rhyme of Salem Town and Other Poems || 2002 || The Lost Mine; Untitled: ("Under the grim San Saba hills") ||  || Letter: H. P. Lovecraft, April 23, 1933  || 
|-
| Untitled: ("Love is singing soft and low") || 4 || Love is singing soft and low || The Last of the Trunk Och Brev I Urval || 2007-03 Mar 2007 ||  ||   Wikisource   || Letter: Tevis Clyde Smith, c. December 1928 ; PD || 
|-
| Untitled: "Madame Goose's Rhymes" || 41 || Hark, hark, the jackals bark || Fantasy Crossroads #7 || 1976-02 Feb 1976 || Untitled: ("Hark, hark, the jackals bark") ||  || Tentative title  || 
|-
| Untitled: ("Mahomet! Man of Mecca!") ||  || Mahomet! Man of Mecca! || A Rhyme of Salem Town and Other Poems || 2002 || Mahomet ||  ||  || 
|-
| Untitled: "Mankind" || 72 || The world has changed || A Rhyme of Salem Town and Other Poems || 2002 || Untitled: ("The world has changed") ||  || Tentative title ; An early work  || 
|-
| Untitled: ("Many fell at the grog-shop wall") || 2 || Many fell at the grog-shop wall || Robert E. Howard: Selected Letters: 1923-1930 || 1989-10 Oct 1989 ||  ||  || Letter: Tevis Clyde Smith, c. November 1931  || 
|-
| Untitled: ("The Master beat on his master-drum") || 27 || The Master beat on his master-drum || Night Images || 1976 || The Master-Drum ||  || Tentative title  || 
|-
| Untitled: ("Match a toad with a far-winged hawk") || 58 || Match a toad with a far-winged hawk || The Last of the Trunk Och Brev I Urval || 2007-03 Mar 2007 ||  ||  Wikisource || Letter: Tevis Clyde Smith, c. undated ; PD || 
|-
| Untitled: ("Men are toys ...") || 4 || Men are toys ... || Lewd Tales || 1987 ||  ||  || Letter: Tevis Clyde Smith, c. March 1929 ; From: Songs of Bastards || 
|-
| Untitled: ("Men I have slain with naked steel") || 24 || Men I have slain with naked steel || A Rhyme of Salem Town and Other Poems || 2002 || The Sword of Lal Singh ||  || Tentative title ; An early work  || 
|-
| Untitled: "Men of the Shadows" (verse heading) || 34 || From the dim red dawn of Creation || Always Comes Evening || 1957 || Untitled: ("From the dim red dawn of Creation") ||  "Men of the Shadows" || From: Men of the Shadows ; Originally untitled  || 
|-
| Untitled: ("Men say my years are few; yet I am old") || 20 || Men say my years are few; yet I am old || Science-Fantasy Correspondent #1 || 1975-12 Dec 1975 || The Guise of Youth ||  || Tentative title  || 
|-
| Untitled: "Mine But to Serve" || 91 || The moonlight glimmered white across the sands || A Rhyme of Salem Town and Other Poems || 2002 || Untitled: ("The moonlight glimmered white") ||  || Tentative title  || 
|-
| Untitled: ("Mingle my dust with the burning brand") || 12 || Mingle my dust with the burning brand || The Collected Letters of Robert E. Howard, Volume 1: 1923-1929 || 2007-06 Jun 2007 ||  ||  Wikisource || Letter: Tevis Clyde Smith, c. August 28, 1925 ; PD || 
|-
| Untitled: ("Mist and madness and mockery rule") || 4 || Mist and madness and mockery rule || THE COLLECTED LETTERS OF ROBERT E. HOWARD, VOLUME 2: 1930–1932 || 2007 || Untitled MIST AND MADNESS AND MOCKERY RULE || ||  Letter: From a letter to Tevis Clyde Smith, ca. May 1930 ||
|-
| Untitled: "A Misty Sea" || 6 || There is a misty sea beneath the earth || A Rhyme of Salem Town and Other Poems || 2002 || Untitled: ("There is a misty sea beneath the earth") ||  || Tentative title  || 
|-
| Untitled: ("The moon above the Kerry hills") || 22 || The moon above the Kerry hills ||  ||  || Retribution; The Song of Murtagh O'Brien; Black Michael's Story ||  ||  || Thom, Herman & Woods, § B
|-
| Untitled: ("Moonlight and shadows barred the land") || 8 || Moonlight and shadows barred the land || The Last of the Trunk Och Brev I Urval || 2007-03 Mar 2007 ||  ||  Wikisource || Letter: Tevis Clyde Smith, c. late 1928 ; PD || 
|-
| Untitled: ("The moonlight glimmered white") || 91 || The moonlight glimmered white across the sands || A Rhyme of Salem Town and Other Poems || 2002 || Mine But to Serve ||  || Tentative title  || 
|-
| Untitled: ("Moses was our leader") || 64 + a 12-line revision || Moses was our leader  || Shadows of Dreams || 1989 || The Odyssey of Israel ||  || Letter: Tevis Clyde Smith, c. March 1926 ; In multiple parts, part of a projected longer work  || 
|-
| Untitled: ("Mother Eve, Mother Eve, I name you a fool") || 4 || Mother Eve, Mother Eve, I name you a fool || The Collected Letters of Robert E. Howard, Volume 1: 1923-1929 || 2007-06 Jun 2007 ||  ||   Wikisource  || Letter: Tevis Clyde Smith, c. January 1928 ; PD || 
|-
| Untitled: ("Murky the night") || 7 || Murky the night || A Rhyme of Salem Town and Other Poems || 2002 ||  ||  || Unfinished  || 
|-
| Untitled: ("My brother he was an auctioneer") || 56 || My brother he was an auctioneer || The Last of the Trunk Och Brev I Urval || 2007-03 Mar 2007 ||  ||   Wikisource || Letter: Tevis Clyde Smith, c. November–December 1928 ; PD || 
|-
| Untitled: ("My brothers are blond and calm of speech") || 16 || My brothers are blond and calm of speech || Verses in Ebony || 1975 || Alien ||  ||  || Thom, Herman & Woods, § A
|-
| Untitled: ("My heart is a silver drum tonight") || 14 || My heart is a silver drum tonight || Shadows of Dreams || 1989 ||  ||  || Letter: Tevis Clyde Smith, c. November 1928  || The Call of PanThom, Herman & Woods, § C
|-
| Untitled: ("My name is Baal; I walked the earth of yore") || 57 || My name is Baal; I walked the earth of yore || A Rhyme of Salem Town and Other Poems || 2002 || Baal ||  || Tentative title  || Thom, Herman & Woods, § B
|-
| Untitled: ("Mystic Lore") || 4 || A wizard who dwelt by Drumnakill || A Rhyme of Salem Town and Other Poems || 2002 || Untitled: ("A wizard who dwelt by Drumnakill") ||  || Tentative title  || 
|-
| Untitled: "Never Beyond the Beast" || 16 || Rise to the peak of the ladder || The Ghost Ocean and Other Poems of the Supernatural || 1982 || Untitled: ("Rise to the peak of the ladder") ||  || Tentative title  || 
|-
| Untitled: ("Night falls") || 18 || Night falls || Weirdbook #11 || 1977 || Nocturne ||  || Tentative title  || 
|-
| Untitled: ("Night in the county of Donegal") || 28 || Night in the county of Donegal || A Rhyme of Salem Town and Other Poems || 2002 || Farewell, Proud Munster ||  || Tentative title ; An early work  || 
|-
| Untitled: The Night Winds || 32 || The night winds whisper across the grass || Verses in Ebony || 1975 || ("The night winds whisper across the grass") ||  || Tentative title  || 
|-
| Untitled: ("The night winds whisper across the grass") || 32 || The night winds whisper across the grass || Verses in Ebony || 1975 || The Night Winds ||  || Tentative title  || 
|-
| Untitled: Nisapur || 20 || The day that towers, sapphire kissed || Always Comes Evening || 1957 || Untitled: ("The day that towers, sapphire kissed") ||  "Nisapur" || Originally untitled  || 
|-
| Untitled: ("No Man's Land")|| 28 || Across the wastes of No Man's Land, the grey-clad slayers came || A Rhyme of Salem Town and Other Poems || 2002 || Untitled ("Across the wastes of No Man's Land") ||  || c || 
|-
| Untitled: No More the Serpent Prow || 8 || The House of Asgard passes with the night || The Howard Collector #14 || 1971-03-21 Spring 1971 ||   Untitled: ("The House of Asgard passes with the night") ||  || Tentative title Originally untitled  || 
|-
| Untitled: ("'No more!' they swear") || 10 || "No more!" they swear; I laugh to hear them speak || The Howard Collector #18 || 1973-09-21 Autumn 1973 || The Legacy of Tubal-Cain ||  || Originally untitled  || 
|-
| Untitled: ("Noah was my applesauce") || 24 || Noah was my applesauce || The Collected Letters of Robert E. Howard, Volume 1: 1923-1929 || 2007-06 Jun 2007 ||  ||  Wikisource || Letter: Tevis Clyde Smith, c. November 1928 ; PD || 
|-
| Untitled: "Nocturne" || 18 || Night falls || Weirdbook #11 || 1977 || Untitled: ("Night falls") ||  || Tentative title  || 
|-
| Untitled: "Now and Then" || 9 || 'Twas twice a hundred centuries ago || A Rhyme of Salem Town and Other Poems || 2002 ||   Untitled: ("'Twas twice a hundred centuries ago") ||  || Tentative title ; Unfinished  || 
|-
| Untitled: ("Now anthropoid and leprous shadows lope") || 18 || Now anthropoid and leprous shadows lope || Amazing Stories || 1986-03 Mar 1986 || All Hallows Eve ||  || Tentative title  || Thom, Herman & Woods, § A
|-
| Untitled: ("Now bright, now red, the sabers sped") || 8 || Now bright, now red, the sabers sped among the || The Last of the Trunk Och Brev I Urval || 2007-03 Mar 2007 ||  ||  Wikisource || Letter: Tevis Clyde Smith, June 23, 1923 ; PD || 
|-
| Untitled: ("Now come the days of high endeavor") || 98 || Now come the days of high endeavor and / The blare of brazen trumpets through the land.  || Shadows of Dreams || 1989 || A Fable for Critics || || || Letter: Tevis Clyde Smith, ca. November–December 1928 || 
|-
| Untitled: ("Now hark to this tale of long ago") || 19 || Now hark to this tale of long ago || A Rhyme of Salem Town and Other Poems || 2002 || When Men Were Bold ||  || Tentative title ; An early work ; Unfinished  || 
|-
| Untitled: ("Now is a summer come out of the sea") || 24 || Now is a summer come out of the sea || Amra (vol. 2, no. 8) || 1959-11 Nov-December 1959 || But the Hills Were Ancient Then ||  Wikisource || Originally untitled ; Title created by George Scithers ; PD || Thom, Herman & Woods, § B
|-
| Untitled: ("Now that the kings have fallen") || 32 || Now that the kings have fallen || The Howard Collector #11 || 1969-03-21 Spring 1969 || Where Are Your Knights, Donn Othna? ||  || Originally untitled  || 
|-
| Untitled: ("Now the stars are all gleaming ...") || 32 || Now the stars are all gleaming || The Collected Letters of Robert E. Howard, Volume 1: 1923-1929 || 2007-06 Jun 2007 || Untitled: ("Now the stars are all gleaming ...") ||  || Mnemonic reconstruction Letter: Robert W. Gordon, May 14, 1928; Howard's rendition of "a song I heard once some time ago and have heard only once," sung to him by a "wandering willy" to whom he'd given a lift; NOT INCLUDED IN COLLECTED POETRY
|-
| Untitled: O the Brave Sea-Rover || 4 || Ah, the rover hides in Aves when he runs || A Rhyme of Salem Town and Other Poems || 2002 || Untitled: ("Ah, the rover hides in Aves when he runs") ||  || Tentative title ; An early work  || 
|-
| Untitled: "The Oaks" || 5 || The great grey oaks by the banks of the river || A Rhyme of Salem Town and Other Poems || 2002 || Untitled: ("The great grey oaks by the banks of the river") ||  || Tentative title  || 
|-
| Untitled: "The Odyssey of Israel" || 64 + a 12-line revision || Moses was our leader  || Shadows of Dreams || 1989 || Untitled: ("Moses was our leader") ||  || Letter: Tevis Clyde Smith, c. March 1926 ; In multiple parts, part of a projected longer work  || 
|-
| Untitled: ("O'er lakes agleam the old gods dream") || 8 || O'er lakes agleam the old gods dream || Always Comes Evening || 1957 || Chant of the White Beard ||  || From: Men of the Shadows ; Originally untitled ; From: Men of the Shadows  || Thom, Herman & Woods, § C
|-
| Untitled: ("Oh, the road to glory lay") || 4 || Oh, the road to glory lay || n/a || n/a ||  ||  || From: The Pit of the Serpent (attributed to Mushy Hansen) ; Never published separately  || 
|-
| Untitled: ("Oh, we are little children ...") || 2 || Oh, we are little children ... ||  ||  ||  ||  || Letter: Tevis Clyde Smith, c. November 1928 ; From: People of the Winged Skulls  || 
|-
| Untitled: ("Oh, ye who tread the narrow way") || 4 || Oh, ye who tread the narrow way || A Rhyme of Salem Town and Other Poems || 2002 || Exhortation ||  || Tentative title ; An early work  || 
|-
| Untitled: ("Old Faro Bill was a man of might") || 20 || Old Faro Bill was a man of might || The Collected Letters of Robert E. Howard, Volume 1: 1923-1929 || 2007-06 Jun 2007 ||  ||  Wikisource || Letter: Tevis Clyde Smith, c. November 1928 ; PD || 
|-
| Untitled: "On With the Play" || 14 || Up with the curtain, lo, the stage is set || The Howard Collector #17 || 1972-09-21 Autumn 1972 ||   Untitled: ("Up with the curtain, lo, the stage is set") ||  || Originally untitled  || 
|-
| Untitled: ("One slept beneath the branches dim") || 44 || One slept beneath the branches dim || Red Shadows || 1968 || The Return of Sir Richard Grenville ||  || Originally untitled ; A Solomon Kane poem || 
|-
| Untitled: "Only a Shadow on the Grass" || 4 || The tribes of men rise up and pass || Weirdbook #13 || 1978 || Untitled: ("The tribes of men rise up and pass") ||  || Tentative title  || 
|-
| Untitled: ("Out in front of Goldstein's") || 8, plus seven additional 2-line choruses—22 lines total || Out in front of Goldstein's || The Last of the Trunk Och Brev I Urval || 2007-03 Mar 2007 ||  ||   Wikisource  || Letter: Tevis Clyde Smith, c. December 1928 ; PD || 
|-
| Untitled: ("Out of Asia the tribesmen came") || 4 || Out of Asia the tribesmen came || The Cross Plainsman || 2004-08 Aug 2004 ||  ||   Wikisource || Letter: Tevis Clyde Smith, July 30, 1923 ; PD; In addition to the opening 8-line song parody of "East Side, West Side (The Sidewalks of New York)," there are also seven two-line choruses scattered throughout the letter || 
|-
| Untitled: ("Out of the Texas desert") || 31 || Out of the Texas desert, over the Rio Grande || A Rhyme of Salem Town and Other Poems || 2002 || The Bandit ||  || Tentative title ; An early work  || Thom, Herman & Woods, § B
|-
| Untitled: "The Outcast" || 12 || Forth from the purple and feats of the palace || The Grim Land and Others || 1976 ||   Untitled: ("Forth from the purple") ||  || Tentative title  || 
|-
| Untitled: "An Outworn Story" || 21 || There come long days when the soul turns sick || Fantasy Tales || 1987-06-21 Summer 1987 || Untitled: ("There come long days when the soul turns sick") ||  || Tentative title ; British  || 
|-
| Untitled: ("Over the hills the winds of the seas") || 14 || Over the hills the winds of the seas || A Rhyme of Salem Town and Other Poems || 2002 || The Winds of the Sea, The (1) ||  || Tentative title  || 
|-
| Untitled: ("Over the hills the winds of the seas") (2) || 16 || Over the hills the winds of the seas || The Last of the Trunk Och Brev I Urval || 2007-03 Mar 2007 || The Winds of the Sea ||  ||  || 
|-
| Untitled: ("Over the old Rio Grandey") || 12 || Over the old Rio Grandey || A Rhyme of Salem Town and Other Poems || 2002 || Over the Old Rio Grandey ||  || Tentative title ; An early work  || 
|-
|  Untitled: ("Over the place the lights go out") || 47 || Over the place the lights go out || Robert E. Howard's Fight Magazine #4 || 1996-10 Oct 1996 || In the Ring ||  || Tentative title  || 
|-
| Untitled: ("Palm-trees are waving in the Gulf breeze") || putatively 36 lines, when divided into couplets, but some lines and stanzas are written across the page like prose || Palm-trees are waving in the Gulf breeze || Austin, vol. 3, no. 1 || 1992-05 May 1992 ||  ||  || Letter: Tevis Clyde Smith, September 7, 1924 ; Distributed as part of REHUPA #115  || 
|-
| Untitled: Passing of the Elder Gods || 4 || The elder gods have fled || A Rhyme of Salem Town and Other Poems || 2002 || Untitled: ("The elder gods have fled") ||  || Tentative title  || 
|-
| Untitled: "The Phantoms Gather" || 6 || Up over the cromlech and down the rath || A Rhyme of Salem Town and Other Poems || 2002 || Untitled: ("Up over the cromlech") ||  || Tentative title  || 
|-
| Untitled: "The Phases of Life" || 5 || Life is the same, yet of many phases || Unaussprechlichen Kulten #2 || 1992-07 Jul 1992 || Untitled: ("Life is the same, yet of many phases") ||  || Tentative title ; French  || 
|-
| Untitled: "The Plains of Gilban" || 12 || Red swirls the dust || A Rhyme of Salem Town and Other Poems || 2002 || Untitled: ("Red swirls the dust") ||  || Tentative title  || 
|-
| Untitled: "Prelude" || 4 || I caught Joan alone upon her bed || A Rhyme of Salem Town and Other Poems || 2002 || Untitled: ("I caught Joan alone upon her bed") ||  || Tentative title  || 
|-
| Untitled: "Prince and Beggar" || 18 || I was a prince of China, lord of a million spears || Always Comes Evening || 1957 || Untitled: ("I was a prince of China") ||  || Originally untitled  || 
|-
| Untitled: ("Ramona! Romona!") || 4 || Romona! Romona! || The Last of the Trunk Och Brev I Urval || 2007-03 Mar 2007 || Untitled: ("Romona! Romona!") ||  Wikisource  || Letter: Tevis Clyde Smith, c. November–December 1928 ; "Ramona" spelling a probable typo?; PD || 
|-
| Untitled: ("Rattle of drums") || 48 || Rattle of drums || A Rhyme of Salem Town and Other Poems || 2002 || Rattle of Drums ||  || Tentative title  || 
|-
| Untitled: ("Rebel souls from the falling dark") || 8 || Rebel souls from the falling dark || The Collected Letters of Robert E. Howard, Volume 1: 1923-1929 || 2007-06 Jun 2007 ||  ||  Wikisource || Letter: Tevis Clyde Smith, c. November 1928 ; PD || 
|-
| Untitled: ("Red swirls the dust") || 12 || Red swirls the dust || A Rhyme of Salem Town and Other Poems || 2002 || The Plains of Gilban ||  || Tentative title  || 
|-
| Untitled: Retribution || 22 || The moon above the Kerry hills ||  ||  || Retribution; The Song of Murtagh O'Brien; Black Michael's Story Untitled: ("The moon above the Kerry hills") ||  ||  || Thom, Herman & Woods, § B
|-
| Untitled: The Return of Sir Richard Grenville || 44 || One slept beneath the branches dim || Red Shadows || 1968 || Untitled: ("One slept beneath the branches dim") ||  || Originally untitled ; A Solomon Kane poem || 
|-
| Untitled: ("The Return of the Sea-Farer") || 36 || Thorfinn, Thorfinn, where have you been? || Weirdbook #13 || 1978 || Untitled: ("Thorfinn, Thorfinn, where have you been?") ||  ||  || 
|-
| Untitled: A Rhyme of Salem Town and Other Poems || 74 || As I went down to Salem town, I met good Mistress Meek ||   Untitled: ("As I went down to Salem town, I met good Mistress Meek") || 2002 || A Rhyme of Salem Town ||  || Tentative title  || 
|-
| Untitled: ("Rise to the peak of the ladder") || 16 || Rise to the peak of the ladder || The Ghost Ocean and Other Poems of the Supernatural || 1982 || Never Beyond the Beast ||  || Tentative title  || 
|-
| Untitled: Road to Hell, The || 28 || Along the road that leads to Hell || Singers in the Shadows || 1970 ||   Untitled: ("Along the road that leads to Hell") ||  Wikisource || Lines 1-4 similar to lines 69-72 of The Dust Dance (version 1) ; PD  Tentative title || 
|-
| Untitled: "Roads" || 4 || I too have strode those white-paved roads that run || The Howard Collector #17 || 1972-09-21 Autumn 1972 || Untitled: ("I too have strode those white-paved roads") ||  || Originally untitled  || 
|-
| Untitled: ("Roar, silver trumpets") || 8 || Roar, silver trumpets, in your pride || Night Images || 1976 || Roar, Silver Trumpets ||  || Tentative title  || 
|-
| Untitled: ("Romona! Romona!") || 4 || Romona! Romona! || The Last of the Trunk Och Brev I Urval || 2007-03 Mar 2007 || Untitled: ("Ramona! Romona!") ||  Wikisource  || Letter: Tevis Clyde Smith, c. November–December 1928 ; PD || 
|-
| Untitled: ("Roses laughed in her pretty hair") || 10 || Roses laughed in her pretty hair || The Collected Letters of Robert E. Howard, Volume 1: 1923-1929 || 2007-06 Jun 2007 ||  ||  Wikisource   || Letter: Tevis Clyde Smith, August 28, 1925 ; PD || 
|-
| Untitled: "Rune" || 34 || Gods of heather, gods of lake || Always Comes Evening || 1957 ||  Rune of the Ancient One;  Untitled: ("Gods of heather, gods of lake") ||  "Rune" || From: Men of the Shadows ; Originally untitled ; Separate version called Rune of the Ancient One  || 
|-
| Untitled: "Rune of the Ancient One" || 34 || Gods of heather, gods of lake || Always Comes Evening || 1957 ||  Rune;  Untitled: ("Gods of heather, gods of lake") ||  "Rune" || From: Men of the Shadows ; Originally untitled ; Separate version called Rune of the Ancient One  || 
|-
| Untitled: "The Sand-Hills' Crest" || 39 || Here where the post oaks crown the ridge, and the dreary sand-drifts lie || A Robert E. Howard Memorial: June 13–15, 1986 || 1986 || Untitled: ("Here where the post oaks crown the ridge") ||  || Tentative title  || 
|-
| Untitled: ("A sappe ther wos and that a crumbe manne") || 16 || A sappe ther wos and that a crumbe manne || The Collected Letters of Robert E. Howard, Volume 1: 1923-1929 || 2007-06 Jun 2007 ||  ||  Wikisource || Letter: Tevis Clyde Smith, c. November 1928 ; PD || 
|-
| Untitled: ("Sappho, the Grecian hills are gold") || 4 || Sappho, the Grecian hills are gold || The Last of the Trunk Och Brev I Urval || 2007-03 Mar 2007 ||  ||  Wikisource   || Letter: Tevis Clyde Smith, c. November–December 1928 ; PD || 
|-
| Untitled: ("Scarlet and gold are the stars tonight") || 8 || Scarlet and gold are the stars tonight || The Cross Plainsman || 2004-08 Aug 2004 (last four lines only) / The Collected Letters of Robert E. Howard, Volume 1: 1923-1929 (first full appearance)|| Adventures ||  Wikisource || Letter: Tevis Clyde Smith, c. November 1928 ; PD || 
|-
| Untitled: "Sea-Chant" || 4 || Topaz seas and laughing skies || A Rhyme of Salem Town and Other Poems || 2002 || Untitled: ("Topaz seas and laughing skies") ||  || Tentative title  || 
|-
| Untitled: ("The shades of night were falling faster") || 6 || The shades of night were falling faster || The Last of the Trunk Och Brev I Urval || 2007-03 Mar 2007 ||  ||  Wikisource   || Letter: Tevis Clyde Smith, April 14, 1926 ; PD || 
|-
| Untitled "Shadow Thing" || 28 || There was a thing of the shadow world || The Ghost Ocean and Other Poems of the Supernatural || 1982 || Untitled ("There was a thing of the shadow world") ||  || Tentative title ; From: Untitled, begins "As he approached the two..." / || 
|-
| Untitled: ("She came in the dim of the desert dawn") || 36 || She came in the dim of the desert dawn || Lone Star Universe || 1976 || Coming of Bast, The; Untitled: "She came in the dim of the desert dawn ..." ||  || Letter: Tevis Clyde Smith, undated, a version  || Thom, Herman & Woods, § C
|-
| Untitled: ("She came in the grey of the desert dawn") || 46 || She came in the grey of the desert dawn || The Collected Letters Of Robert E. Howard, Volume 3: 1933–1936 || 2008 || Coming of Bast, The—draft; Untitled: "She came in the grey of the desert dawn ..." ||  || Letter: Tevis Clyde Smith, undated, beginning "Ha, Ha! Your not going ..."  || Thom, Herman & Woods, § C
|-
| Untitled: "The Slayer" || 24 || The women come and the women go || Slayer, The || A Rhyme of Salem Town and Other Poems || 2002 || Untitled: ("The women come and the women go") ||  Wikisource   || Letter: Tevis Clyde Smith, c. December 1928 ; PD  || 
|-
| Untitled: "A Song from an Ebony Heart" || 44 || The wine in my cup is bitter dregs  || Shadows of Dreams || 1989 || Untitled: ("The wine in my cup is bitter dregs") ||  || Letter: Tevis Clyde Smith; c. November 1928) || 
|-
| Untitled "Song of a Fugitive Bard" || 30 || They gave me a dollar and thirty cents when they let me outa my cell || Shadows of Dreams || 1989 || Untitled ("They gave me a dollar and thirty cents") ||  || Letter: Tevis Clyde Smith; c. June 1928) || 
|-
| Untitled: A Song of Bards || 5 || Chesterton twanged on his lyre || A Rhyme of Salem Town and Other Poems || 2002 || s Untitled: ("Chesterton twanged on his lyre") ||  || Tentative title  || 
|-
| Untitled: A Song of Defeat || 28 ||  || Magazine of Horror #34 || 1970-09-21 Fall 1970 ||   Untitled: ("We are they") ||  || Originally untitled  || 
|-
| Untitled: The Song of Murtagh O'Brien || 22 || The moon above the Kerry hills ||  ||  || Black Michael's Story; Untitled: ("The moon above the Kerry hills"); Retribution; ;  ||  ||  || Thom, Herman & Woods, § B
|-
| Untitled: ("A Song of the Naked Lands") || 92 || You lolled in gardens where breezes fanned || A Song of the Naked Lands (chapbook)|| 1973 || Untitled: ("You lolled in gardens") ||  || Originally untitled  || 
|-
| Untitled: "Song of the Pict" || 14 || Wolf on the height || Always Comes Evening || 1957 ||   Untitled: ("Wolf on the height") ||  "Song of the Pict" || From: Men of the Shadows ; Originally untitled  || 
|-
| Untitled: "A Song of the Race" || 72 || High on this throne sat Bran Mak Morn || Bran Mak Morn || 1969-09 Sep 1969 || Untitled: ("High on this throne sat Bran Mak Morn") ||  || Originally untitled ; A Bran Mak Morn poem || 
|-
| Untitled: ("The spiders of weariness come on me") || 4 || The spiders of weariness come on me || The Collected Letters of Robert E. Howard, Volume 1: 1923-1929 || 2007-06 Jun 2007 ||  ||  Wikisource || Letter: Tevis Clyde Smith, c. March 1928 ; PD || 
|-
| Untitled: "The Stralsund" || 5 || He has rigged her and tricked her || A Rhyme of Salem Town and Other Poems || 2002 ||   Untitled: ("He has rigged her and tricked her") ||  || Tentative title  || 
|-
| Untitled: ("Strange Passion") || 34 || Ah, I know black queens whose passions blaze  || Risque Stories #1 || 1984-03 Mar 1984 || Untitled: ("Ah, I know black queens" ||  || Tentative title  || 
|-
| Untitled: "Summer Morn" || 5 || Am-ra stood on a mountain height || Kull: Exile of Atlantis || 2006-10 Oct 2006 ||   Untitled: ("Am-ra stood on a mountain height") ||   Wikisource || Tentative title ; PD || 
|-
| Untitled: "The Sword of Lal Singh" || 24 || Men I have slain with naked steel || A Rhyme of Salem Town and Other Poems || 2002 || Untitled: ("Men I have slain with naked steel") ||  || Tentative title ; An early work  || 
|-
| Untitled: ("Swords glimmered up the pass") || 93 || Swords glimmered up the pass || The Collected Letters of Robert E. Howard, Volume 1: 1923-1929 || 2007-06 Jun 2007 ||  ||  Wikisource || Letter: Tevis Clyde Smith, c. November 1928 ; PD || 
|-
| Untitled: "The Symbol" || 24 || Eons before Atlantean days in the time of the world's black dawn || Ariel || 1976-09-21 Autumn 1976 || Untitled: ("Eons before Atlantean days") ||  || Tentative title  || 
|-
| Untitled: ("Take some honey from a cat") || 5 || Take some honey from a cat || The Last of the Trunk Och Brev I Urval || 2007-03 Mar 2007 ||  ||  Wikisource   || Letter: Tevis Clyde Smith, c. August–September 1927 ; PD || 
|-
| Untitled: ("") ||  || The tall man answered: ... ||  ||  ||  ||  || Letter: Tevis Clyde Smith, c. November 1928 ; From: People of the Winged Skulls  || 
|-
| Untitled: ("") ||  || The tall man rose and said: ... ||  ||  ||  ||  || Letter: Tevis Clyde Smith, c. November 1928 ; From: People of the Winged Skulls  || 
|-
| Untitled: ("") ||  || The tall man said: ... ||  ||  ||  ||  || Letter: Tevis Clyde Smith, c. November 1928 ; From: People of the Winged Skulls  || 
|-
| Untitled: ("Tell me not in coocoo numbers") || 4 || Tell me not in coocoo numbers || The Collected Letters of Robert E. Howard, Volume 1: 1923-1929 || 2007-06 Jun 2007 ||  ||  || Letter: Tevis Clyde Smith, c. October 1927 ; From the story The Fastidious Fooey Mancucu  || |
|-
| Untitled: ("That is no land for weaklings") || 28 || That is no land for weaklings, no land for coward or fool || A Rhyme of Salem Town and Other Poems || 2002 || Zululand ||  || Tentative title ; An early work  || 
|-
| Untitled: ("Then Stein the peddler with rising joy") || 14 || Then Stein the peddler with rising joy || The Last of the Trunk Och Brev I Urval || 2007-03 Mar 2007 ||  ||  Wikisource   || Letter: Tevis Clyde Smith, c. July 1930 ; PD || 
|-
| Untitled: ("There are grim things did") || 44 || There are grim things did || The Last of the Trunk Och Brev I Urval || 2007-03 Mar 2007 || The Ballad of Singapore Nell--draft ||  || Letter: Tevis Clyde Smith, undated ; From a draft of The Ballad of Singapore Nell  || 
|-
| Untitled: ("There burns in me no honeyed drop of love") || 4 || There burns in me no honeyed drop of love || Always Comes Evening || 1957 || Invective ||  "Invective" ||  || 
|-
| Untitled: ("There come long days when the soul turns sick") || 21 || There come long days when the soul turns sick || Fantasy Tales || 1987-06-21 Summer 1987 || An Outworn Story ||  || Tentative title ; British  || 
|-
| Untitled: ("There is a misty sea beneath the earth") || 6 || There is a misty sea beneath the earth || A Rhyme of Salem Town and Other Poems || 2002 || A Misty Sea ||  || Tentative title  || 
|-
| Untitled: ("There is a sea and a silent moon") || 16 || There is a sea and a silent moon || The Ghost Ocean and Other Poems of the Supernatural || 1982 || The Ghost Ocean ||  || Tentative title  || 
|-
| Untitled: ("There is a strangeness in my soul") || 60 || There is a strangeness in my soul || Rhymes of Death || 1975 || Ecstasy ||  || Tentative title ; shares some stanzas with "A cringing woman's lot is hard" || 
|-
| Untitled: ("There once was a wicked old elf") || 5 (limerick) || There once was a wicked old elf || The Last of the Trunk Och Brev I Urval || 2007-03 Mar 2007 ||  ||  Wikisource   || Letter: Tevis Clyde Smith, undated ; PD || 
|-
| Untitled ("There was a thing of the shadow world") || 28 || There was a thing of the shadow world || The Ghost Ocean and Other Poems of the Supernatural || 1982 || Shadow Thing ||  || Tentative title ; From: Untitled, begins "As he approached the two..." / || 
|-
| Untitled ("There was a young girl from Siberia") || 15 || There was a young girl from Siberia || Desire and Other Erotic Poems || 1989 || Limericks to Spank By ||  || Tentative title ; Three 5-line limericks  || 
|-
| Untitled ("There was an old dick whose name was Stiff") || 2 4-line ditties for a total of 8 lines || There was an old dick whose name was Stiff || THE LAST OF THE TRUNK OCH BREV I URVAL ||  ||  || || Letter: Tevis Clyde Smith, ca. March 1929; contained in the untitled story "Hatrack!"; titled with the first line in COLLECTED POETRY || 
|-
| Untitled ("There were three lads who went their destined ways") || 53 || There were three lads who went their destined ways || The Last of the Trunk Och Brev I Urval || 2007-03 Mar 2007 ||  ||  wikisource || Letter: Tevis Clyde Smith, undated ; PD || 
|-
| Untitled ("There's a bell that hangs in a hidden cave") || 24 || There's a bell that hangs in a hidden cave || Bran Mak Morn — The Last King || 2001 || The Bell of Morni ||  || Tentative title  || Thom, Herman & Woods, § B
|-
| Untitled ("There's a calling and a calling and a calling")|| 8 || There's a calling and a calling || A Rhyme of Salem Town and Other Poems || 2002 ||  Untitled ("There's a calling and a calling and a calling")||  || Tentative title  || Thom, Herman & Woods, § C
|-
| Untitled ("There's an isle far away on the breast of the sea") || 24 || There's an isle far away on the breast of the sea || The Last of the Trunk Och Brev I Urval || 2007-03 Mar 2007 ||  ||  Wikisource || Letter: Tevis Clyde Smith, c. December 1928 ; PD || 
|-
| Untitled ("They break from the pack") || 24 || They break from the pack and seek their own track || A Rhyme of Salem Town and Other Poems || 2002 || Untamed Avatars ||  || Tentative title  || 
|-
| Untitled: ("They came to a village which lay / Within a king's domains ...") || 27 || They came to a village which lay / Within a king's domains || The Collected Letters of Robert E. Howard, Volume 1: 1923-1929 || 2007-06 Jun 2007 || The Search ||  || Mnemonic reconstruction of "The Search" by Edgar Lee Masters; Letter: Robert W. Gordon, February 4, 1925; NOT INCLUDED IN COLLECTED POETRY ||
|-
| Untitled ("They cast her out of the court of the king") || 44 || They cast her out of the court of the king || Chacal #2 || 1977-03-21 Spring 1977 || Daughter of Evil ||  || Letter: Tevis Clyde Smith, c. September 1930 ; Tentative title  || 
|-
| Untitled ("They gave me a dollar and thirty cents") || 30 || They gave me a dollar and thirty cents when they let me outa my cell || Shadows of Dreams || 1989 || Song of a Fugitive Bard ||  || Letter: Tevis Clyde Smith; c. June 1928) || 
|-
| Untitled ("They matched me up that night") || 24 || They matched me up that night || The Last of the Trunk Och Brev I Urval || 2007-03 Mar 2007 ||  ||  Wikisource   || Letter: Tevis Clyde Smith, c. June 1928 ; PD || 
|-
| Untitled ("They were there, in the distance dreaming") || 4 || They were there, in the distance dreaming || Dear HPL: Letters, Robert E. Howard to H.P. Lovecraft, 1933-1936 || 2002 ||  ||  || Letter: H. P. Lovecraft, April 23, 1933  || 
|-
| Untitled ("This is a young world") ||  || This is a young world || The Right Hook, vol. 1, #3 || 1925-03-23 1925 ||  ||  ||  || 
|-
| Untitled: ("This is the tale of a nameless fight") || 1,046 || This is the tale of a nameless fight || The Ballad of King Geraint || 1989 || The Ballad of King Geraint ||  || Tentative title ; Title provided by Lenore Preece ; Letter: Harold Preece, January 4, 1930  || Thom, Herman & Woods, § B
|-
| Untitled: ("This is the tale the Kaffirs tell") || 28 || This is the tale the Kaffirs tell as the tints of twilight melt || Fantasy Tales || 1983-12-21 Winter 1983 || "The Zulu Lord"||  || Tentative title ; British  || 
|-
| Untitled: ("Thomas Fitzgerald, Shane O'Neill") || 24 || Thomas Fitzgerald, Shane O'Neill ||  ||  || Black Harps in the Hills || A shorter version of the 53-line "Black Harps in the Hills";  Letter: Harold Preece, c. March 1929, a version  || Thom, Herman & Woods, § B
|-
| Untitled: ("Thorfinn, Thorfinn, where have you been?") || 36 || Thorfinn, Thorfinn, where have you been? || Weirdbook #13 || 1978 || The Return of the Sea-Farer||  ||  || 
|-
| Untitled: "A Thousand Years Ago" || 21 || I was a chief of the Chatagai || Night Images || 1976 ||   Untitled: ("I was a chief of the Chatagai") ||  || Tentative title  || 
|-
| Untitled: ("A thousand years ago great Genghis reigned") || 4 || A thousand years ago great Genghis reigned || A Rhyme of Salem Town and Other Poems || 2002 || Krakorum ||  || Tentative title ; An early work ; An introduction by Howard states that he was 17 when he wrote this poem  || 
|-
| Untitled ("A thousand years, perhaps, have come and gone") || 32 || A thousand years, perhaps, have come and gone || Up John Kane! and Other Poems || 1977 || When Death Drops Her Veil ||  || Tentative title  ||  
|-
| Untitled: ("Through the mists of silence there came a sound") || 9 || Through the mists of silence there came a sound || Yesteryear #4 || 1989-10 Oct 1989 ||  ||  || Letter: Tevis Clyde Smith, c. February 1929  || 
|-
|  Untitled: ("'Throw out that Red!' they cried ...")|| 4 || "'Throw out that Red!' they cried ..." || The Collected Letters Of Robert E. Howard, Volume 1: 1923–1929 || 2007 || Throw out that Red! ||   || ||Letter: Tevis Clyde Smith, c. March 1929 || 
|-
| Untitled: ("Thus in my mood I love you") || 30 || Thus in my mood I love you || Omniumgathum || October 1976 || To a Woman (3); The Tide ||  || Pen name: Patrick Howard  || 
|-
| Untitled: ("Thus in my mood I love you") || 30 || Thus in my mood I love you ||  ||  || To a Woman (3); The Tide ||  || Very similar to THE TIDE—-the last two lines of "Tide" have been truncated; some punctuational differences, one word changed, and third and fourth lines of each verse are combined in a single line || 
|-
| Untitled: ("The Tide") || 30 || Thus in my mood I love you ||  ||  || To a Woman (3); The Tide  Untitled: ("Thus in my mood I love you") ||  || Very similar to THE TIDE—-the last two lines of "Tide" have been truncated; some punctuational differences, one word changed, and third and fourth lines of each verse are combined in a single line || 
|-
| Untitled: ("The times, the times ...") || 14 || The times, the times ... || The New Howard Reader #5 || 1999-03 Mar 1999 ||  ||  || Written on the endpapers of a copy of Beau Geste  || 
|-
| Untitled: ("Tingle, jingle, dingle, tingle") || 23 || Tingle, jingle, dingle, tingle, hear my brazen tones || A Rhyme of Salem Town and Other Poems || 2002 || Little Bell of Brass ||  || Tentative title  || 
|-
| Untitled: To a Woman || 30 || Thus in my mood I love you ||  ||  ||  (3); The Tide; Untitled: ("Thus in my mood I love you") ||  || Very similar to THE TIDE—-the last two lines of "Tide" have been truncated; some punctuational differences, one word changed, and third and fourth lines of each verse are combined in a single line || 
|-
| Untitled: ("To Harry the Oliad Men") || 12 || When the first winds of summer the roses brought || Omniumgathum || 1976 || Untitled: ("When the first winds of summer") ||  || Tentative title  || 
|-
| Untitled: ("Toast to the British!") || 6 || Toast to the British! Damn their souls to Hell. || The Last of the Trunk Och Brev I Urval || 2007-03 Mar 2007 ||  ||  Wikisource   || Letter: Tevis Clyde Smith, c. August–September 1927 ; PD || 
|-
| Untitled: ("Topaz seas and laughing skies") || 4 || Topaz seas and laughing skies || A Rhyme of Salem Town and Other Poems || 2002 || Sea-Chant ||  || Tentative title  || 
|-
| Untitled: ("The towers stand recorders") || 16(?) || The towers stand recorders || The Robert E. Howard Foundation Newsletter, vol. 1, #2 || 2007-11 Nov 2007 || The Builders (3) ||  ||  || 
|-
| Untitled: The Trail of Gold|| 8 || Come with me to the Land of Sunrise || A Rhyme of Salem Town and Other Poems || 2002 || Untitled: ("Come with me to the Land of Sunrise") ||  || Tentative title ; An early work  || 
|-
| Untitled: "Trail's End" || 4 || Ho, for a trail that is bloody and long || A Rhyme of Salem Town and Other Poems || 2002 || Untitled: ("Ho, for a trail that is bloody and long") ||  || Tentative title ; Possibly incomplete ; From: Untitled, begins "As he approached..."  || 
|- 
| Untitled: ("Tread not where stony deserts hold") || 4 || Tread not where stony deserts hold || Dark Things || 1971 || The House in the Oaks; The Children of the Night ||  || Third of the three verses from "The House In The Oaks" (with "An Open Window" and "Arkham").  Originally from an early draft of "The Children of the Night", attributed to fictitious poet Justin Geoffrey.  Replaced in the final version with two lines from "The Gates of Damascus" by James Flecker, this poem was added by Derleth to his version of "The House in the Oaks"; titled with the first line in COLLECTED POETRY.   || Thom, Herman & Woods, § C
|-
| Untitled: ("The tribes of men rise up and pass") || 4 || The tribes of men rise up and pass || Weirdbook #13 || 1978 || Only a Shadow on the Grass ||  || Tentative title  || 
|-
| Untitled: ("'Turn out the light.'") || 14 || "Turn out the light." I raised a willing hand || Desire and Other Erotic Poems || 1989 || Desire ||  || Tentative title  || 
|-
| Untitled: ("'Twas twice a hundred centuries ago") || 9 || 'Twas twice a hundred centuries ago || A Rhyme of Salem Town and Other Poems || 2002 || Now and Then ||  || Tentative title ; Unfinished  || 
|-
| Untitled: ("Under the grim San Saba hills") || 60 || Under the grim San Saba hills || A Rhyme of Salem Town and Other Poems || 2002 || The Lost Mine; The Lost San Saba Mine ||  || Letter: H. P. Lovecraft, April 23, 1933  || 
|-
| Untitled Untamed Avatars || 24 || They break from the pack and seek their own track || A Rhyme of Salem Town and Other Poems || 2002 || Untitled ("They break from the pack") ||  || Tentative title  || 
|-
| Untitled: ("Up over the cromlech") || 6 || Up over the cromlech and down the rath || A Rhyme of Salem Town and Other Poems || 2002 || The Phantoms Gather ||  || Tentative title  || 
|-
| Untitled: ("Up with the curtain, lo, the stage is set") || 14 || Up with the curtain, lo, the stage is set || The Howard Collector #17 || 1972-09-21 Autumn 1972 || On With the Play ||  || Originally untitled  || 
|-
| Untitled: ("The warm veldt spread beneath the tropic sun") || 84 || The warm veldt spread beneath the tropic sun || A Rhyme of Salem Town and Other Poems || 2002 || The Chief of the Matabeles ||  || Tentative title ; Unfinished /; An early work  || Thom, Herman & Woods, § C
|-
| Untitled: Warning, A(2) (partial version)  || 16 || You have built a world of paper and wood || The Howard Collector #5 || 1964-06-21 Summer 1964 || Untitled: ("You have built a world of paper and wood") ||  || Letter: August Derleth, May 9, 1936 ; Share lines with version 1  || 
|-
| Untitled: "Was I There?" || 10 || I, was I there || A Rhyme of Salem Town and Other Poems || 2002 || Untitled: ("I, was I there") ||  || Tentative title  || 
|-
| Untitled: ("We are the duckers of crosses") || 20 || We are the duckers of crosses || The Last of the Trunk Och Brev I Urval || 2007-03 Mar 2007 ||  ||  Wikisource || parody of "We Are the Music Makers" || Letter: Tevis Clyde Smith, April 14, 1926; PD || 
|-
| Untitled: ("We are they") || 28 ||  || Magazine of Horror #34 || 1970-09-21 Fall 1970 || A Song of Defeat ||  || Originally untitled  || 
|-
| Untitled: ("We reap and bind the bitter yield") || 4 || We reap and bind the bitter yield || The Howard Collector || 1972-09-21 Autumn 1972 || Harvest ||  || Originally untitled  || 
|-
| Untitled: ("We, the winds that walk the world") || 64 || We, the winds that walk the world || A Rhyme of Salem Town and Other Poems || 2002 || The Winds That Walk the World ||  || Tentative title  || 
|-
| Untitled: ("We're a jolly good bunch of bums") || 4 || We're a jolly good bunch of bums || A Rhyme of Salem Town and Other Poems || 2002 || Code ||  || Tentative title ; An early work  || Thom, Herman & Woods, § C
|-
| Untitled: ("What's become of Waring") || 8 || What's become of Waring || The Last of the Trunk Och Brev I Urval || 2007-03 Mar 2007 ||  ||  Wikisource   || Letter: Tevis Clyde Smith, c. Fall 1927 ; PD; Parody of "Waring" by Robert Browning || 
|-
| Untitled: "When Death Drops Her Veil" || 32 || A thousand years, perhaps, have come and gone || Up John Kane! and Other Poems || 1977 || Untitled: ("A thousand years, perhaps, have come and gone") ||  || Tentative title  || 
|-
| Untitled: ("When I was a youth") || 12 || When I was a youth, a deep craving for truth || A Rhyme of Salem Town and Other Poems || 2002 || When I Was a Youth ||  || Tentative title  || 
|-
| Untitled: When Men Were Bold || 19 || Now hark to this tale of long ago || A Rhyme of Salem Town and Other Poems || 2002 || Untitled: ("Now hark to this tale of long ago") ||  || Tentative title ; An early work ; Unfinished  || 
|-
| Untitled: ("When Napoleon down in Africa") || 13 || When Napoleon down in Africa || Austin, vol. 3, no. 1 || 1992-05 May 1992 ||  ||  || Letter: Tevis Clyde Smith, June 8, 1923 ; Distributed as part of REHUPA #115  || 
|-
| Untitled: ("When the first winds of summer") || 12 || When the first winds of summer the roses brought || Omniumgathum || 1976 || To Harry the Oliad Men ||  || Tentative title  || 
|-
| Untitled: "When the Glaciers Rumbled South" || 12 || I cut my teeth on toil and pain || The Ghost Ocean and Other Poems of the Supernatural || 1982 || Untitled: ("I cut my teeth on toil and pain") ||  || Tentative title  || 
|-
| Untitled: "When the Gods Were Kings" || 16 || Where the jungle lies dank, exuding || Spoor Anthology #1 || 1974 || Untitled: ("Where the jungle lies dank, exuding") ||  || Tentative title  || 
|-
| Untitled: ("When wolf meets wolf") || 4 ||  || The Golden CaliphThe Last Celt || 1922-01 1922/19231976 || When Wolf Meets Wolf ||  || An early work ; Conflict: , The Last Celt, 1976/, The Golden Caliph, 1922/3 || 
|-
| Untitled: ("When you were a set-up and I was a ham") || 44 || When you were a set-up and I was a ham || REH FIGHT MAGAZINE #2 (Chpbk.) ||  ||  ||  || Letter:  Tevis Clyde Smith, May 24, 1925; probably inspired by Langdon Smith's "Evolution" (a.k.a. "When you were a tadpole and I was a fish"), cited in the November 4, 1923, letter to Tevis Clyde Smith) ||
|-
| Untitled: "Where Are Your Knights, Donn Othna?" || 32 || Now that the kings have fallen || The Howard Collector #11 || 1969-03-21 Spring 1969 ||   Untitled: ("Now that the kings have fallen") ||  || Originally untitled  || 
|-
| Untitled: ("Where the jungle lies dank, exuding") || 16 || Where the jungle lies dank, exuding || Spoor Anthology #1 || 1974 || When the Gods Were Kings ||  || Tentative title  || 
|-
| Untitled: Who is Grandpa Theobold? || 19 || Cities brooding beneath the seas || The Howard Collector #6 || 1965-03-21 Spring 1965 || Lines To Lovecraft; Untitled: ("Cities brooding beneath the seas") ||  || Originally untitled ; Letter: Tevis Clyde Smith, c. November 1931  || 
|-
| Untitled: "Who Is Grandpa Theobald?" (verse heading) || 4 || Let it rest with the ages mysteries || The Collected Letters of Robert E. Howard, Volume 2: 1930-1932 || 2007-10 Oct 2007 || Lines To Lovecraft; Untitled: ("Let it rest with the ages mysteries") ||   ||  Letter: Tevis Clyde Smith, c. November 1931 ;Not actually written by Howard, but a quote from WHERE CANNIKANS CLINKED by Charles Nichols Webb, which, to confuse matters, Robert Louis Stevenson also cited in a poem || 
|-
| Untitled: "Who Shall Sing of Babylon?" || 43 || High the towers and mighty the walls, oh, proud-crested sons of Babylon || A Rhyme of Salem Town and Other Poems || 2002 || Untitled: ("High the towers and mighty the walls") ||  || Tentative title  || 
|-
| Untitled: ("Wide and free ranging") || 7 || Wide and free ranging || A Rhyme of Salem Town and Other Poems || 2002 || The Desert ||  || Tentative title ; An early work  || 
|-
| Untitled: ("The wild bees hum") || 8 || The wild bees hum in the tangled vines || A Rhyme of Salem Town and Other Poems || 2002 || Land of the Pioneer ||  || Tentative title ; An early work  || 
|-
| Untitled: "Winds of the Sea, The" (1) || 14 || Over the hills the winds of the seas || A Rhyme of Salem Town and Other Poems || 2002 ||   Untitled: ("Over the hills the winds of the seas") (1) ||  || Tentative title  || 
|-
| Untitled: "Winds of the Sea, The" (2) || 16 || Over the hills the winds of the seas || The Last of the Trunk Och Brev I Urval || 2007-03 Mar 2007 || Untitled: ("Over the hills the winds of the seas") (2) ||  ||  || 
|-
| Untitled: ("The Winds That Walk the World") || 64 || We, the winds that walk the world || A Rhyme of Salem Town and Other Poems || 2002 || Untitled: ("We, the winds that walk the world") ||  || Tentative title  || 
|-
| Untitled: ("The wine in my cup is bitter dregs") || 44 || The wine in my cup is bitter dregs  || Shadows of Dreams || 1989 || A Song from an Ebony Heart ||  || Letter: Tevis Clyde Smith; c. November 1928) || 
|-
| Untitled: ("A wizard who dwelt by Drumnakill") || 4 || A wizard who dwelt by Drumnakill || A Rhyme of Salem Town and Other Poems || 2002 || Mystic Lore ||  || Tentative title  || 
|-
| Untitled: ("Wolf on the height") || 14 || Wolf on the height || Always Comes Evening || 1957 || Song of the Pict ||  "Song of the Pict" || From: Men of the Shadows ; Originally untitled  || 
|-
| Untitled: ("The women come and the women go") || 24 || The women come and the women go || Slayer, The || A Rhyme of Salem Town and Other Poems || 2002 || The Slayer ||  Wikisource   || Letter: Tevis Clyde Smith, c. December 1928 ; PD  || 
|-
| Untitled: ("The world goes back to the primitive, yea") || 4 || The world goes back to the primitive, yea || The Collected Letters of Robert E. Howard, Volume 1: 1923-1929 || 2007-06 Jun 2007 ||  ||  Wikisource || Letter: Tevis Clyde Smith, c. January 1928  || 
|-
| Untitled: ("The world has changed") || 72 || The world has changed || A Rhyme of Salem Town and Other Poems || 2002 || Mankind ||  || Tentative title ; An early work  || 
|-
| Untitled: ("The world is rife, say I") || 8 || The world is rife, say I || A Rhyme of Salem Town and Other Poems || 2002 || Freedom ||  || Tentative title  || 
|-
| Untitled: ("The years are as a knife") || 42 || The years are as a knife against my heart || Magazine of Horror #19 || 1968-01 Jan 1968 || The Years Are as a Knife ||  ||  || 
|-
| Untitled: ("You have built a world of paper and wood") || 16 || You have built a world of paper and wood || The Howard Collector #5 || 1964-06-21 Summer 1964 || Warning, A (2)  ||  || Letter: August Derleth, May 9, 1936 ; Share lines with version 1  || 
|-
| Untitled: ("You lolled in gardens where breezes fanned ...") || 92 || You lolled in gardens where breezes fanned || A Song of the Naked Lands (chapbook)|| 1973 || A Song of the Naked Lands ||  || Originally untitled  || 
|-
| Untitled: ("The Zulu Lord") || 28 || This is the tale the Kaffirs tell as the tints of twilight melt || Fantasy Tales || 1983-12-21 Winter 1983 || ||  Untitled: ("This is the tale the Kaffirs tell") || Tentative title ; British  || 
|-
| Untitled: ("Zululand") || 28 || That is no land for weaklings, no land for coward or fool || A Rhyme of Salem Town and Other Poems || 2002 || Untitled: (" That is no land for weaklings") ||  || Tentative title ; An early work  || 
|-
| "Up, John Kane!" || 23 || Up, John Kane, the grey night's falling || Up John Kane! and Other Poems || 1977 ||  ||  ||  || 
|-
| Up over the cromlech ... || 6 || Up over the cromlech and down the rath || A Rhyme of Salem Town and Other Poems || 2002 || Untitled ("Up over the cromlech ..."); Phantoms Gather, The ||  || Tentative title  || 
|-
| "Up with the curtain, lo, ..." || 14 || Up with the curtain, lo, the stage is set || The Howard Collector #17 || 1972-09-21 Autumn 1972 || On With the Play; Untitled ("Up with the curtain, lo, ...") ||  || Originally untitled  || 
|-
|  Vampire  ||  ||  || n/a || n/a ||  ||  || Lost || Thom, Herman & Woods, § C
|-
| Victory || 48 || Red fires in the North are glowing bright || Night Images || 1976 ||  ||  ||  || 
|-
| Viking of the Sky, The || 80 || The skies are red before me || Austin, vol. 3, no. 3 || 1992-11 Nov 1992 ||  ||  || Letter: Tevis Clyde Smith, undated ; Distributed as part of REHUPA #118  || 
|-
| Viking's Trail || 22 || From the sullen cliffs and the grim fiords || Verses in Ebony || 1975 ||  ||  ||  || 
|-
| Viking's Vision || 44 || A white sea was flowing, a bitter wind was blowing || The Ghost Ocean and Other Poems of the Supernatural || 1982 || Viking's Vision, A ||  ||  || 
|-
| Vision, A || 32 || Long glaives of frozen light crawled up and down || Startling Mystery Stories || 1967-09-21 Fall 1967 || Black Mass ||  || || 
|-
| Visions || 8 || I cannot believe in a paradise || The Howard Collector #16 || 1972-03-21 Spring 1972 ||  ||  Wikisource || || 
|-
| Voices of the Night [poem cycle]|| 134 || 1. The blind black shadows reach inhuman arms / 2. Now in the gloom the pulsing drums repeat / 3. Ten million years beyond the sweep of Time / 4. The great black tower rose to split the stars / 5. A roar of battle thundered in the hills || The Last of the Trunk Och Brev I Urval || 2007-03 Mar 2007 || Echoing Shadows; Iron Harp, The ||  || A group of five poems: "The Voices Waken Memory" (24 lines); "Babel" (19 lines); "Laughter in the Gulfs" (18 lines);  "Moon Shame" (34 lines); and "A Crown for a King" (39 lines); Letter: Tevis Clyde Smith, undated, beginning "The Seeker thrust ..."; Does NOT include the individual poem "The Iron Harp," which is, confusingly, the fourth poem in the BLACK DAWN cycle! || 
|-
| Voices Waken Memory, The || 24 || The blind black shadows reach inhuman arms || The Fantasy Fan || 1934-09 Sep 1934 || A Drum Begins to Throb; Out of the Deep ||  Wikisource || PD; Part 1 of the Voices of the Night cycle || 
|-
| Wanderer, The || 12 || I wandered through a forest land || A Rhyme of Salem Town and Other Poems || 2002 ||  ||  || Incomplete, only the first eleven lines survive  || 
|-
|  The Wanderlust  ||  ||  || n/a || n/a ||  ||  || Lost || Thom, Herman & Woods, § C
|-
| War to the Blind || 16 || War is thunder of unseen feet || Fantasy Crossroads #4/5 || 1975-08 Aug 1975 ||  ||  ||  || 
|-
| "The warm veldt spread ..." || 84 || The warm veldt spread beneath the tropic sun || A Rhyme of Salem Town and Other Poems || 2002 || Chief of the Matabeles, The; Untitled ("The warm veldt spread ...") ||  || Tentative title ; Unfinished /; An early work  || Thom, Herman & Woods, § C
|-
| Warning, A (1) || 24 || I come in the wail of the broken skies || Echoes from an Iron Harp || 1972 ||  ||  || Share lines with version 2  || 
|-
| Warning, A (2) || 16 || You have built a world of paper and wood || The Howard Collector #5 || 1964-06-21 Summer 1964 || Untitled ("You have builded a world of paper and wood") ||  || Letter: August Derleth, May 9, 1936 ; Share lines with version 1  || 
|-
| Warning to Orthodoxy, A|| 36 || Frozen crust that a hoof cuts through || Shadows of Dreams || 1989 ||  ||  || Letter: Tevis Clyde Smith, c. July 1928  || 
|-
| Was I There? || 10 || I, was I there || A Rhyme of Salem Town and Other Poems || 2002 || Untitled ("I, was I there") ||  || Tentative title  || 
|-
| We are the duckers of crosses || 20 || We are the duckers of crosses || The Last of the Trunk Och Brev I Urval || 2007-03 Mar 2007 || Untitled: We are the duckers of crosses ||  Wikisource || parody of "We Are the Music Makers" || Letter: Tevis Clyde Smith, April 14, 1926; PD 
|-
| "We are they" || 28 || We are they || Magazine of Horror #34 || 1970-09-21 Fall 1970 || Song of Defeat, A; Untitled ("We are they") ||  || Originally untitled  || 
|-
| "We reap and bind the bitter yield" || 4 || We reap and bind the bitter yield || The Howard Collector || 1972-09-21 Autumn 1972 || Harvest; Untitled ("We reap and bind the bitter yield") ||  || Originally untitled  || 
|-
| Weakling, The || 14 || I died in sin and forthwith went to Hell || A Robert E. Howard Memorial: June 13–15, 1986 || 1986 ||  ||  Wikisource ||  || 
|-
| Weird Ballad, A || 25 || The werewolf came across the hill || Shadows of Dreams || 1989 ||  ||  || Letter: Tevis Clyde Smith, c. April 1932  || 
|-
| "We're a jolly good bunch of bums" || 4 || We're a jolly good bunch of bums || A Rhyme of Salem Town and Other Poems || 2002 || Code; Untitled ("We're a jolly good bunch of bums") ||  || Tentative title ; An early work  || Thom, Herman & Woods, § C
|-
| West || 4 || West to the halls of Belshazzar || A Rhyme of Salem Town and Other Poems || 2002 ||  ||  ||  || 
|-
| What is Love? ||  ||  || The Right Hook vol. 1, #2 || 1925-03-22 1925 ||  ||  ||  || 
|-
| What's become of Waring? || 8 || What's become of Waring || The Last of the Trunk Och Brev I Urval || 2007-03 Mar 2007 || Untitled: What's become of Waring ||  Wikisource  || Letter: Tevis Clyde Smith, c. Fall 1927 ; PD; Parody of "Waring" by Robert Browning || 
|-
| Wheel of Destiny, The || 12 || The day of man's set doom is come || A Rhyme of Salem Town and Other Poems || 2002 || Doom ||  ||  || 
|-
|  When Arthur Rides Again  ||  ||  || n/a || n/a ||  ||  || Lost || Thom, Herman & Woods, § C
|-
| When Death Drops Her Veil || 32 || A thousand years, perhaps, have come and gone || Up John Kane! and Other Poems || 1977 || Untitled ("A thousand years, perhaps, have come and gone") ||  || Tentative title  || 
|-
| When I Was a Youth || 12 || When I was a youth, a deep craving for truth || A Rhyme of Salem Town and Other Poems || 2002 || Untitled ("When I was a youth") ||  || Tentative title  || 
|-
| When I Was in Africa || 21 || When I was down in Africa, in Africa, in Africa || A Rhyme of Salem Town and Other Poems || 2002 ||  ||  || An early work  || 
|-
| When Men Were Bold || 19 || Now hark to this tale of long ago || A Rhyme of Salem Town and Other Poems || 2002 || Untitled ("Now hark to this tale of long ago") ||  || Tentative title ; An early work ; Unfinished  || 
|-
|  When Napoleon down in Africa  || 13 || When Napoleon down in Africa || Austin, vol. 3, no. 1 || 1992-05 May 1992 || Untitled: When Napoleon down in Africa ||  || Letter: Tevis Clyde Smith, June 8, 1923 ; Distributed as part of REHUPA #115  || 
|-
| "When the first winds of summer ..." || 12 || When the first winds of summer the roses brought || Omniumgathum || 1976 || To Harry the Oliad Men; Untitled ("When the first winds of summer ...") ||  || Tentative title  || 
|-
| When the Glaciers Rumbled South || 12 || I cut my teeth on toil and pain || The Ghost Ocean and Other Poems of the Supernatural || 1982 || Untitled ("I cut my teeth on toil and pain") ||  || Tentative title  || 
|-
| When the Gods Were Kings || 16 || Where the jungle lies dank, exuding || Spoor Anthology #1 || 1974 || Untitled ("Where the jungles lay dank, exuding") ||  || Tentative title  || 
|-
| When Wolf Meets Wolf || 4 || When wolf meets wolf || The Golden CaliphThe Last Celt || 1922-01 1922/19231976 || Untitled ("When wolf meets wolf") ||  || An early work ; Conflict: , The Last Celt, 1976/, The Golden Caliph, 1922/3 || 
|-
| "When you were a set-up and I was a ham" || 44 || When you were a set-up and I was a ham || REH FIGHT MAGAZINE #2 (Chpbk.) || September 1990 || Untitled: ("When you were a set-up and I was a ham") ||  || Letter:  Tevis Clyde Smith, May 24, 1925; probably inspired by Langdon Smith's "Evolution" (a.k.a. "When you were a tadpole and I was a fish"), cited in the November 4, 1923, letter to Tevis Clyde Smith) ||
|-
| Whence Cometh Erlik? ||  ||  || Robert E. Howard Foundation Newsletter Volume 6 Number 3 || 2012 ||  ||  || An untitled poem from the Glenn Lord collection || 
|-
| Where Are Your Knights, Donn Othna? || 32 || Now that the kings have fallen || The Howard Collector #11 || 1969-03-21 Spring 1969 || Untitled ("Now that the kings have fallen") ||  || Originally untitled  || 
|-
| "Where the jungles lay dank, exuding" || 16 || Where the jungle lies dank, exuding || Spoor Anthology #1 || 1974 || When the Gods Were Kings; Untitled ("Where the jungles lay dank, exuding") ||  || Tentative title  || 
|-
| Which Will Scarcely Be Understood || 45 || Small poets sing of little, foolish things || Weird Tales || 1937-10 Oct 1937 ||  ||  "Which Will Scarcely Be Understood" ||  || 
|-
| Whispers || 16 || I was born in a lonesome land  || Shadows of Dreams || 1989 ||  ||  || Letter: Tevis Clyde Smith, c. March 1930  || 
|-
| Whispers on the Nightwinds || 12 || "I would ride on the winds, I would soar like a gull || Shadows of Dreams || 1989 ||  ||  || Letter: Tevis Clyde Smith, c. April 1930  || 
|-
| White Thunder || 24 || I was a child in Cornwall where the mountains meet the shore || Singers in the Shadows || 1970 ||  ||  ||  || 
|-
| Who is Grandpa Theobold? || 19 || Cities brooding beneath the seas || The Howard Collector #6 || 1965-03-21 Spring 1965 || Untitled ("Cities brooding beneath the seas") ||  || Originally untitled ; Letter: Tevis Clyde Smith, c. November 1931  || 
|-
| Untitled: "Who Shall Sing of Babylon?" || 43 || High the towers and mighty the walls, oh, proud-crested sons of Babylon || A Rhyme of Salem Town and Other Poems || 2002 || Untitled: ("High the towers and mighty the walls") ||  || Tentative title  || 
|-
| Whoopansat of Humorous Kookooyam, The || 96 || Rise, seize your clothes, prepare yourself for flight || Risque Stories #2 || 1984-10 Oct 1984 ||  ||  || A parody of Omar Khayyam  || 
|-
| "Wide and free swings the desert ..." || 7 || Wide and free swings the desert, far as reaches the eye || A Rhyme of Salem Town and Other Poems || 2002 || Desert, The; Untitled ("Wide and free ranging ...") ||  || Tentative title ; An early work  || 
|-
| "The wild bees hum ..." || 8 || The wild bees hum in the tangled vines || A Rhyme of Salem Town and Other Poems || 2002 || Land of the Pioneer; Untitled ("The wild bees hum ...") ||  || Tentative title ; An early work  || 
|-
| Winds of the Sea, The (1) || 14 || Over the hills the winds of the seas || A Rhyme of Salem Town and Other Poems || 2002 || Untitled ("Over the hills the winds ...") ||  || Tentative title  || 
|-
| Winds of the Sea, The (2) || 16 || Over the hills the winds of the seas || The Last of the Trunk Och Brev I Urval || 2007-03 Mar 2007 ||  ||  ||  || 
|-
| Winds That Walk the World, The || 64 || We, the winds that walk the world || A Rhyme of Salem Town and Other Poems || 2002 || Untitled ("We, the winds that walk the world") ||  || Tentative title  || 
|-
| "The wine in my cup is bitter dregs ..." || 44 || The wine in my cup is bitter dregs  || Shadows of Dreams || 1989 || Song from an Ebony Heart, A Untitled ("The wine in my cup is bitter dregs ...") ||  || Letter: Tevis Clyde Smith; c. November 1928) || 
|-
| Witch, The || 28 || We set a stake amid the stones || Singers in the Shadows || 1970 ||  ||  ||  || 
|-
| "A wizard who dwelt in Drumnakill" || 4 || A wizard who dwelt by Drumnakill || A Rhyme of Salem Town and Other Poems || 2002 || Mystic Lore; Untitled ("A wizard who dwelt in Drumnakill") ||  || Tentative title  || 
|-
| "Wolf on the height" || 14 || Wolf on the height || Always Comes Evening || 1957 || Untitled: "Song of the Pict"; Untitled: ("Wolf on the height") ||  "Song of the Pict" || From: Men of the Shadows ; Originally untitled  || 
|-
|The women come and the women go || 24 || The women come and the women go ||  A Rhyme of Salem Town and Other Poems || 2002 || Slayer, The; Untitled: The women come and the women go || ||  Wikisource   || Letter: Tevis Clyde Smith, c. December 1928 ; PD  || 
|-
| Word from the Outer Dark, A || 24 || My ruthless hands still clutch at life || Kadath #1 || 1974 || Song from the Outer Dark, A ||  || Pen name: Patrick Howard  || 
|-
|  The world goes back to the primitive, yea  || 4 || The world goes back to the primitive, yea || The Collected Letters of Robert E. Howard, Volume 1: 1923-1929 || 2007-06 Jun 2007 || Untitled: The world goes back to the primitive, yea ||   Wikisource || Letter: Tevis Clyde Smith, c. January 1928  || 
|-
| "The world has changed" || 72 || The world has changed || A Rhyme of Salem Town and Other Poems || 2002 || Mankind; Untitled ("The world has changed") ||  || Tentative title ; An early work  || 
|-
| "The world is rife, say I" || 8 || The world is rife, say I || A Rhyme of Salem Town and Other Poems || 2002 || Freedom; Untitled ("The world is rife, say I") ||  || Tentative title  || 
|-
| Worshippers, The || 24 || Man who looks from the shadows with eyes like the seas of night || A Rhyme of Salem Town and Other Poems || 2002 ||  ||  ||  || 
|-
| Years Are as a Knife, The || 42 || The years are as a knife against my heart || Magazine of Horror #19 || 1968-01 Jan 1968 || Untitled ("The years are as a knife ...") ||  ||  || 
|-
| Yesterdays || 30 || At the dawning of Time when the world was young  || A Rhyme of Salem Town and Other Poems || 2002 ||  ||  ||  || 
|-
| Yodels of Good Sneer to the Pipple, Damn Them || 24 || We are the buttock shakers  || The Collected Letters of Robert E. Howard, Volume 1: 1923-1929 || 2007-06 Jun 2007 ||  ||  Wikisource || Letter: Tevis Clyde Smith, c. November 1928 ; PD; Parody of "We Are the Music-Makers" by Arthur William Edgar O'Shaughnessy || 
|-
| "You have built a world of paper and wood" || 16 || You have built a world of paper and wood || The Howard Collector #5 || 1964-06-21 Summer 1964 || Warning, A (2); Untitled ("You have built a world of paper and wood") ||  || Letter: August Derleth, May 9, 1936 ; Share lines with version 1  || 
|-
| "You lolled in gardens where breezes fanned" || 92 || You lolled in gardens where breezes fanned || A Song of the Naked Lands || 1973 || Song of the Naked Lands, A; Untitled ("You lolled in gardens where breezes fanned") ||  || Originally untitled  || 
|-
|  Young Corbett  ||  ||  || n/a || n/a ||  ||  || Lost || Thom, Herman & Woods, § C
|-
| Young Johnny || 48 || Young Johnny's been on sea || The Collected Letters of Robert E. Howard, Volume 1: 1923-1929 || 2007-06 Jun 2007 || || https://maxhunter.missouristate.edu/songinformation.aspx?ID=1404 || Mnemonic reconstruction of an old folk song ; Letter: Robert W. Gordon, February 4, 1925; third and fourth lines of the second stanza were omitted, and later included in REH's February 15, 1926 letter to Gordon; NOT INCLUDED IN COLLECTED POETRY ||
|-
| Young Lockanbars || 36 || Oh, young Lockanbars has come out || The Golden CaliphThe Last Celt || 1922-01 1922-19231976 ||  ||  || An early work ; Conflict: , The Last Celt, 1976/, The Golden Caliph, 1922/3 || 
|-
| Young Wife's Tale, A || 24 || My husband's brother's wife is a woman I fear and hate || Risque Stories #5 || 1987-03 Mar 1987 ||  ||  || Letter: Tevis Clyde Smith, c. June 1928  || 
|- 
| Youth Spoke — Not in Anger  2) || 24 || They bruised my soul with a proverb || The Howard Collector #18 || 1973-09-21 Autumn 1973 || Life (2) ||   Wikisource || Letter: R. H. Barlow, June 14, 1934  || 
|-
| Zukala's Hour || 48 || High in his dim, ghost haunted tower || Singers in the Shadows || 1970 ||  ||  ||  || 
|-
| Zukala's Jest || 26 || The gods brought a Soul before Zukala || Whispers #5 || 1974-11 Nov 1974 ||  ||  ||  || 
|-
| Zukala's Love Song || 80 || Along the sky my chariot ran || Weird Tales #302 || 1991-09-21 Fall 1991 || Zukala's Mating Song ||  || Some lines published in The Dark Barbarian (1984)  || 
|- style="background:#E0E0E0;"
| Zukala's Mating Song ||  ||  ||  ||  || Zukala's Love Song ||  ||  || 
|-
| Zulu Lord, The || 28 || This is the tale the Kaffirs tell as the tints of twilight melt || Fantasy Tales || 1983-12-21 Winter 1983 || Untitled ("This is the tale the Kaffirs tell ...") ||  || Tentative title ; British  || 
|-
| Zululand || 28 || That is no land for weaklings, no land for coward or fool || A Rhyme of Salem Town and Other Poems || 2002 || Untitled ("That is no land for weaklings ...") ||  || Tentative title ; An early work  || 
|-
|}

Poem cycles
In addition to stand-alone poems, Howard also wrote cycles of poetry.

Notes
Further explanations
  These publications/dates indicate where and when these headings were first published independently of the works to which they were originally attached. 
  These tentative titles were used by Glenn Lord as a means to identify the poems where no original title was available. 
  An early work is defined as one believed to have been written before 1924. 

Notes on publications
  The Tattler was the newspaper of Brownwood High School. 
  The Cross Plains Review is the weekly newspaper for Cross Plains, Texas. 
  The Yellow Jacket is the newspaper of Howard Payne College. 
  The Daniel Baker Collegian was the newspaper of Daniel baker College of Brownwood; the college has since merged with Howard Payne College. 
  The Junto was a literary travelogue circulated from member to member on a mailing list from 1928 to 1930. 
  The Golden Caliph (1922 or 1923, one issue) and The Right Hook (1925, three issues) were amateur magazines created by Robert E. Howard and Tevis Clyde Smith as teenagers. 
  The Progress was published by Cross Plains High School.

Notes on short hand
  All or part of these poems are from or were included in a letter from Robert E. Howard to some recipient (the date is either the explicit date on the letter, an approximate dating of the letter where possible or else simply marked undated).  e.g. "Letter: Tevis Clyde Smith, June 23, 1926" indicates that the poem is from a letter to Tevis Clyde Smith dated June 23, 1926.
  These poems are in the public domain in the United States and any country where the Rule of the Shorter Term applies. 
  With these poems, two or more sources give different publications and dates of the first appearance. e.g. "Conflict: , The Howard Collector, 1962/, The Junto, 1929" indicates that  states first publication as The Howard Collector (published in 1962), while  states first publication as The Junto (published in 1929).  Always listed with the earliest date first.
  Howard sometimes used the same title more than once, or the same title has been attached to untitled works by others.  In these cases the poems have been numbered to distinguish them.  e.g. "(2)" following the title indicates that this the second poem with the same name.
  These poems were published under a pen name.  e.g. "Pen name: Patrick Howard" indicated that the poem was published under the pen name Patrick Howard.
  These poems were first published in a non-American publication. e.g. "French" indicates that it was first published in a French book or magazine.
   These poems are attributed to "Justin Geoffrey," a fictional poet Howard created for his fiction.
  These poems were originally used as epigraphs, heading chapter and whole stories, in works of prose fiction.  This list shows where they were printed separately from the prose.  e.g. "Epigraph: The Phoenix on the Sword" indicates that the poem was used as an opening in the short story The Phoenix on the Sword.
  These poems were part of a different work, usually prose fiction, but were not used to open the work or head chapters.  This list shows where they were printed separately from the main work, if at all. e.g. "From: Men of the Shadows" indicates that this poem was originally included in, or part of, the short storyMen of the Shadows''.
  Poems with these titles are on record but no known copy exists today.

See also

 List of works by Robert E. Howard

References

Bibliographies

Other sources

External links

 
Bibliographies by writer
Poetry bibliographies
Bibliographies of American writers